= Gouge =

Gouge may refer to:

== People ==
- Herbert Dillon Gouge (1843–1917), public servant in South Australia
- Patrick Gouge (born 2003), Jersey cricketer
- Rhonda Gouge (born 1955), American Bluegrass musician
- Thomas Gouge (1609–1681), English Presbyterian clergyman
- William Gouge (1575–1653), English clergyman and author

== Sport ==
- Fish-hooking, gouging as part of self-defence or martial arts
- Eye-gouging (rugby union), an offence in rugby union
- Gouging (fighting style), an antiquated form of combat in the back-country United States

== Other uses ==
- Eye-gouging, the act of pressing or tearing the eye
- Fault gouge, an unconsolidated rock type
- Gouge (chisel), a form of chisel or adze; a woodworking tool
- Gouge (grape), another name for the European wine grape Gouais blanc
  - Gouge noir, another name for the French wine grape Gouget noir
- Price gouging, a legal term

== See also ==
- Seabed gouging by ice, such as an iceberg or sea ice ridge
