= Adelaide Educational Institution =

School in Adelaide, Australia

Adelaide Educational Institution was a privately run non-sectarian academy for boys in Adelaide founded in 1852 by John Lorenzo Young. It was notable as a non-sectarian institution, teaching science, economics and practical arts, in a spirit of mutual respect rather than rote learning and punishment. The school closed when he retired in 1880. By this time Prince Alfred College had emerged as a suitable school for well-to-do Protestants to send their sons.

== History ==
In 1852 Young opened a school with two, then three pupils (Hubert Giles, Caleb Peacock and John Partridge) in the "Peacock Chapel" lent by Mr Peacock in the rear of the (Congregational) Ebenezer Chapel in Ebenezer Place, off the east end of Rundle Street. In September 1852 they were joined by John Waterman, Richard Mahoney, T. L. Cottrell, and G. T. Cottrell. The number grew to seventeen at years end. and he was advertising for evening classes in Geometry and Arithmetic, apply between 6 and 7pm at Stephens Place, off the west end of Rundle Street where the Young family had a home, and to which street the school moved, perhaps as early as 1854, when the current tenant, J. M. Solomon, left for England on the steamer Australian. Fees for day students were 10 guineas (£10/10/-) per annum, (payable quarterly in advance). Facilities were available for boarding. His residence was in the same building on Stephens Place. By December 1855 the school had 107 students, perhaps close to 200 in 1857, 130 in 1862, 133 in 1868. Young's lease expired around 1856–1857.

The next venue was the Congregational chapel in Freeman Street (now that section of Gawler Place between Pirie and Flinders Streets). In 1872 he had new premises built at Parkside on what became Young Street, named after the headmaster. E. S. Hughes recalled, in a letter to The Advertiser, a tableau of life during his time at the institution.

About that time I was at the late J. L. Young's – at Young's Lane, as it was then called – Parkside, as a boarder, and with three other strong Churchmen used to attend St Paul's Church, Flinders Street. Dear old Dean Russell, of blessed memory, wished us to be confirmed; and, as our parents agreed, we escaped from lessons two nights a week to attend classes. Consequently we had a good time going home afterwards, on some occasions climbing the posts and 'dousing the glim' as the sailors say, performing other boyish tricks, and arriving very late because of such 'awfully long classes'

The building was later dubbed "Young House".

== Education in early South Australia ==
(Taken from Geoffrey H. Manning's A Colonial Experience)

From a welter of amateur establishments emerged two institutions, one of which did noble service to two generations, the other the germ of one of the colony's greatest denominational schools today. The first was John Lorenzo Young's Adelaide Educational Institute, which in its peregrinations from a room at the rear of Ebenezer Chapel (now built over by the East End Market), by way of Stephens Place and Gawler Place, to a final home at Young Street, Parkside, educated 1,500 young South Australians many of later distinction – Caleb Peacock, Adelaide's first native-born Mayor, Charles Cameron Kingston, the dominating figure on the colony's political horizon and Joseph Verco, doyen of our medical fraternity. The other institution was the crib in which St Peter's College was created.

== John L. Young ==
John Lorenzo Young (1826–1881) was a Londoner, the son of John Tonkin Young, a builder from Veryan, Cornwall.

He received a non-sectarian education in Europe and England, with emphasis on mathematics and the newly developed sciences of geology, physics and chemistry. He worked in Cornwall on railway and mining construction then left for Adelaide in 1850. on the ship "Panama", arriving on 31 October 1850. He joined the rush to the Victorian goldfields but soon returned.

In 1851 he was appointed second master at the newly opened South Australian High School, under Headmaster Charles Gregory Feinaigle (1817? – 10 March 1880), but the venture failed by the end of the year. The following year Young was persuaded by a group of Congregationalists to open his own school at the rear of the old chapel in Ebenezer Street off Rundle Street East, and soon moved to larger premises in Stephens Place. His brother, Oliver Young, held classes for some time, and acted as headmaster in 1860 while J. L. Young was away on recuperation leave.

In 1861 he built the large two-storey house in Parkside, which was used both as his private residence and as a student boarding house. He then commissioned architects Wright and Hamilton to design and oversee building of a schoolhouse next door. (Edmund Wright had designed many prominent Adelaide buildings including the Town Hall). In 1871 he was able to relinquish the Freeman Street premises.

Young retired in 1880 and closed the school, with the intention of joining his wife and large family who were visiting brother Oliver and his father in Veryan, in Cornwall. On his retirement, a testimonial was held 17 December 1880 by his old scholars, and he was presented with a purse of sovereigns. His 16-room residence, with schoolhouse and various other houses on Young Street, after several auction attempts in February 1881, was eventually purchased by Alfred M. Simpson (who coincidentally had also purchased the Gawler Place school property). The two Parkside buildings, at 61-71 Young Street, were sold by Alfred A., Fred N. and Violet Laura Simpson to Mr. C. O. A. Lapidge in 1922. "Young House" has since been demolished but the heritage-listed schoolhouse still stands.

He embarked on the steamer John Elder in 1881 to visit England (where his father was still living), his family having preceded him, but died on 26 July 1881 while crossing the Red Sea. He was buried at sea. Martha returned to Adelaide, at first living in Kent Town then settled in Glenelg. She died 6 April 1887 aged 57."Death of Mrs J. L. Young". South Australian Register. Vol. LII, no. 12, 606. South Australia. 9 April 1887. p. 5 – via National Library of Australia.

Fred W. Sims, formerly Deputy Registrar of Companies in the Supreme Court, wrote in The Advertiser:

I could tell you quite a lot about John L. Young's school— 'dear old Johnny', as we used to call him ... Mr. Young possessed, among his other fine qualities, the saving grace of humor. It is recorded that his first two pupils were Caleb Peacock and John Partridge. He remarked at the time that, whether he met with success or not as a schoolmaster, he would anyway die "game".

Young's work in South Australia is commemorated by scholarships at the University of Adelaide for research in political economy.

== Classes and curriculum ==
In its first stage of the school's history, Junior (or Third) Class consisted of boys from 7 to 10 years, Science being a chief subject with (although a non-sectarian school) a little religious insight. A small but significant number of students were Jews. No homework was set.

In the Second Class, homework was encouraged and after five hours of schoolwork the more industrious students would voluntarily turn in up to four long essays a week.

In Senior or First Class, subjects covered included political economy, history.

== Masters ==
Other academics at the Institution included:

- Thomas Boutflower Bennett (1808 – 14 September 1894), nicknamed "Tiger", helped run the school, taught English and bookkeeping, later at St Peter's College. His headstone in Moonta cemetery mentions SPC but not AEI. His son J. W. O. Bennett was killed on the Goyder expedition of 1869.
- Thomas Caterer (around 1854) went on to found the notable Norwood Grammar School
- John Howard Clark taught occasionally
- Rev. F. W. Cox taught drawing 1864, 1866
- Edward Dewhirst was classics master for a time.
- C. J. Fox taught Latin from 1868 to 1871 at least. He would later, as the editor and proprietor of The Irish Harp and Farmers' Herald newspaper, become famous after the sacking and excommunication Sister Mary MacKillop by Bishop Sheil. He was ousted from the Catholic Association, of which he was president. for the candid way in which he reported the affair. Frank Fox was a son.
- Henry Greffrath taught French and German from beginning 1852 to mid-1863. He also conducted classes at St Peter's College, and left for Jena, Germany in 1864.
- Wilton Hack succeeded Charles Hill as drawing teacher 1868 W. Hack also taught drawing at Norwood Grammar and St Peter's College.
- A teacher named Harrison, called "Cocky" by students (as was Oliver Young); described as young and pimply, was sacked for drunkenness at a June prizegiving, possibly 1856. A later commentator found him memorable.
- Charles Hill taught drawing
- Philip T. Hill taught writing and arithmetic NOT drawing (perhaps Philip Trelore Hill, married Hannah Fisk in 1869, died 1919), he later taught at Langhorne Creek and Goolwa, and highly regarded.
- G. R. Irwine (d. 7 October 1871) taught Latin, Greek and English.
- Dr Carl Heinrich Loessel (Lössel) taught French, German in 1863, 1864
- Adolph Emile Marval taught French 1866, also at St Peters College. Mme. Caroline Emma Marval opened a Ladies' College.
- F. H. Needham RN taught mathematics, Latin 1861
- George "Pat" Needham BA (1805 – 19 March 1894) (no relation though both taught Latin –)
- Hamilton Charles Palmer (died 1880) Maths and Classics master 1860 while Oliver Young in charge. Boys made fun of him.
- J. R. P. Parsons Classics master, later principal, Adelaide High School
- Rev. Canon Poole (Frederic Slaney Poole) taught advanced Latin 1870
- Hermann von Schleinitz taught French, German 1865 to 1873 (also at St Peter's College, Norwood Grammar).
- James Shakespeare later a professional organist
- Rev. Thomas Smellie (pronounced "smiley") Presbyterian minister arrived Adelaide 1861, registered to grant marriage licences 1862, taught Latin at AEI from 1863 to 1866. Founded Gawler Academy 1868 licence to marry rescinded 1870; returned to Britain 1872.
- Oliver Young (J. L. Young's brother) taught drawing, ran the school in 1860 during his brother's absence. Oliver, whom the students called "Cocky", though not to his face, suffered from a deformed back. He returned to Cornwall in 1866, and never married.

== Timeline ==
- 1852 School opens in Ebenezer Place with two students Caleb Peacock and John Partridge, soon joined by G. T. and T. L. Cottrell, John Waterman and Richard Mahoney.
- 1853 or 1854 Moved to "Stephens Place", previously home to J. M. Solomon and family on the southwest corner of Town Acre 19.
- 1856 or 1857 Moved to schoolroom at rear of Freeman Street Congregational chapel
- 1860 J. L. Young in poor health, on leave in England. Oliver Young acting head for the year.
- 1861 J. L. Young returns, buys 2 acres in Parkside. T. B. Bennett joins staff.
- 1865 Old Scholars' Association dinner
- 1866 Oliver Young returns to England

Old Scholars' Association dinner

- 1867 Congregational Church moves to Stow Hall, AEI takes over Freeman Street chapel.

First Old Scholars' dinner
Old Scholars' AGM

- 1868 Pupil numbers down to 133
- 1869 The Star first (and last?) issue

Old Scholars' dinner

- 1870 Old Scholars dinner

Old Scholars' annual meeting scheduled for 24 June postponed to following week due to poor attendance

- 1871 All teaching now at Young Street, Parkside. T. B. Bennett resigns.

Old Scholars' dinner poor attendance

- 1872 Old Scholars' dinner 12 attendees
- 1880 Presentation to Thomas Bennett >30 attendees
- 1880 School closes
- 1881 J. L. Young dies
- 1887 Mrs Young dies
- 1896 Funeral of Caleb Peacock
- 1897 Stephens Place buildings demolished

== Reunions ==
A group of old scholars felt it appropriate to establish a memorial for J. L. Young, and from 1912 held a series of annual reunion dinners to raise funds for the memorial.

- 1912 Reunion It was at this reunion that Peter Wood moved that a J. L. Young scholarship be established.
- 1913 Second reunion
- 1914 Third reunion
- 1915 Fourth reunion
- 1916 Fifth reunion
- 1917 Sixth reunion
- 1918 Seventh reunion

Function for Eden Herschel Babbage 21 May 1918

- 1919 Eighth reunion
- 1920 Ninth reunion
- 1921 Tenth reunion
- 1925 reunion

== Some students ==
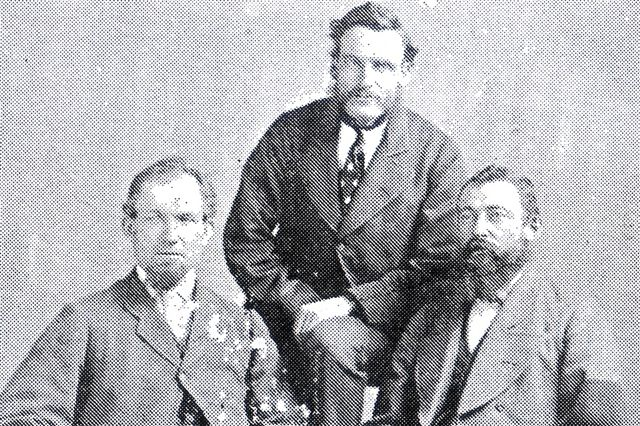
Heroes of the SS Gothenburg wreck Robert Brazil, John Cleland & James Fitzgerald, 1875.

Many of Young's alumni became leading figures in Adelaide's businesses and public service.

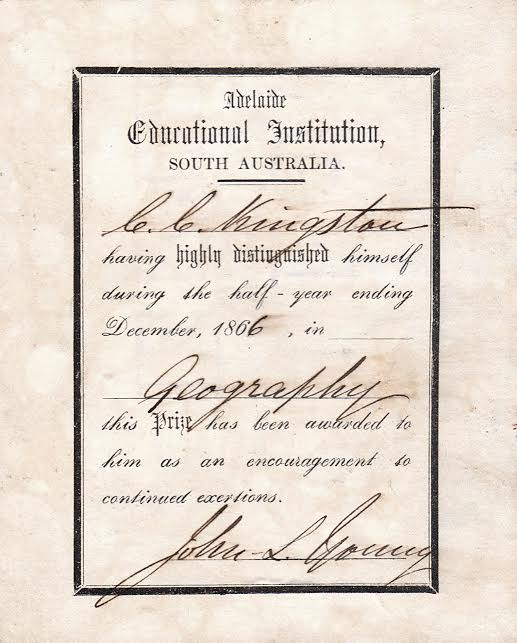
An academic certificate awarded to Charles Kingston from the Adelaide Educational Institution

- George Agars, pioneer of Mildura and Renmark
- W. P. Auld (Stuart Expedition 1861–1862)
- Eden Herschel Babbage (c. 1844–1924) banker and Roseville, New South Wales civic leader, son of Benjamin Herschel Babbage
- Charles Whitmore Babbage (1842–1923) lapsed banker and Wanganui civic leader, his brother
- Thomas William Babbage (4 October 1859 – 1945) manager of the Glenelg Railway Company, later nurseryman, relationship to B. Herschel Babbage not yet established.
- John Barker (businessman) (son of A. E. Barker) chairman of SAJC
- George L. Barrow, journalist son of John Henry Barrow
- G. T. Bean attempted sugar cane plantation in Darwin
- Tom Bee (4 July 1850 – 21 November 1919), cadet surveyor under Goyder in Northern Territory 1864–1870 and with the Overland Telegraph Line. Bees Creek, Northern Territory named for him.
- J. W. O. Bennett surveyor, member of Finniss's 1864 expedition and Goyder's 1869 expedition to Northern Territory
- Edwin S. Berry Second in Charge, Gosse's 1873 expedition to Central Australia; probably the first white man to climb Ayers Rock/Uluru.
- Harry Bickford (1843–1927) and William Bickford (1841–1916) of Bickford & Sons, cordials and pharmaceuticals
- Thomas H. Bowen (1850–1896), surveyor, architect and land agent
- Theodore Bruce (1847–1911) mayor of Adelaide and MLC
- Fred Bullock (Mayor of Adelaide 1891–1892)
- William Burford, chairman W. H. Burford & Sons
- Charles J. Carleton, pioneer of Northern Territory, where he died alone. Son of Caroline Carleton; his name is on her gravestone.
- W. B. Carr, journalist, sportsman and longtime chairman of Adelaide Stock Exchange
- John Carruthers surveyor with Larry Wells
- (Frederick) Arthur Chapman (1864–18 September 1925) managing director Lion Brewing and Malting Company
- Hugh Chambers (c. 1848 – 20 December 1893), son of James Chambers
- Edward Cheetham (c. 1838 – 12 May 1866), only son of Rev. Henry Cheetham
- Francis Howard Clark, accountant and secretary of mining company; son of John Howard Clark
- M(atthew) Symonds Clark (c. 1839 – 10 July 1920)
- John "Jack" Cleland. hero of SS Gothenburg shipwreck
- C. N. Collison, journalist and patent agent
- J. F. Conigrave (1843–1920), businessman; patent agent with Collison
- W. Moxon Cook (1857–1917), sports writer "Trumpator" of The Register and "Terlinga" with The Australasian.
- F. I. Crowder. politician in Western Australia
- William John Jenkins Curnow ( – October 1922), pioneer of Wirrabara
- Edward Nicolle Dewhirst (son of Edward Dewhirst)
- George Dodgson, one of the first pioneer births. Ran plumbing and painting business on Rundle Street.
- D(avid) Walter Duffield (died 24 January 1922) miller and pastoralist, son of Hon. Walter Duffield father of Kenneth Duffield)
- Alfred and Charles George Farr, of Charles Farr & Sons, builders
- Ebenezer Finlayson and Robert Kettle Finlayson, sons of William Finlayson
- John Harvey Finlayson, editor of The South Australian Register
- John Thomas Fitch, draper of J. T. Fitch & Son
- John Francis, chairman of Queensland Cricketing Association
- James Frew Jr. (Stuart Expedition 1861–1862). Frewville, South Australia was named for his father
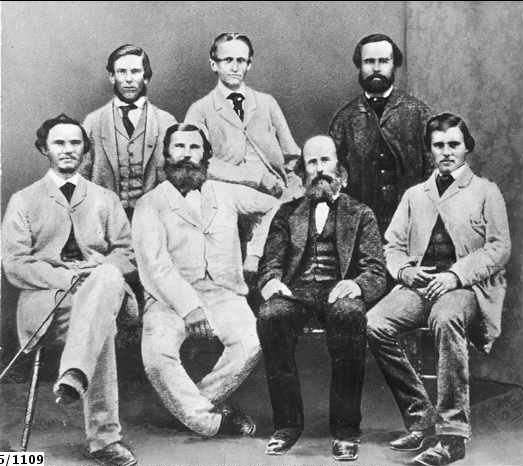
  Members of John McDouall Stuart's 1861–1862 Expedition. Back row: W. P. Auld, J. W. Billiatt and F. W. Thring Front row: J. Frew, W. D. Kekwick, F. G. Waterhouse and S. King. http://johnmcdouallstuart.org.au/companions
  John Frew was his twin brother
- Gavin F(orrest) Gardner ( – 20 March 1919) a founder of Adelaide Stock Exchange. and Dr. William Gardner (c. 1846 – 7 April 1897), surgeon were sons of Rev. John Gardner.
- Alfred Giles, explorer for Overland Telegraph Line survey, manager of stations at Springvale, Delamere, Newcastle Waters for Dr. W. J. Browne; son of Christopher Giles.
- Alfred Leslie Giles (died 5 October 1902) cricketer, bank manager, partner in Giles & Smith; son of Henry Giles
- Acland Giles, Clement Giles, Louis Giles and Mortimer Giles (Registrar-General of Deeds at the Lands Titles Office); sons of William Giles
- Walter J. Gollin (head of Gollin & Co., with headquarters in Melbourne
- William Edward Goode, pastoralist and husband of Mrs. A. K. Goode
- Dr Charles Gosse ophthalmic surgeon at the Adelaide Hospital
- William "Willie" Gosse
- H. D. Gouge SA's first public actuary
- Harry Robin Guerin (1856 – 22 May 1935), private accountant to George Debney and Patrick Gay. He was a founder of SA Society of Accountants, auditor for St Peters Council, many others. A daughter married Rodney Cockburn.
- Dr. Rowland Edward Harrold (1865 – 6 November 1924)
- John H. M. Hawkes, manager Fowler's "Lion" factory
- James S. Hawkes "Geometry Hawkes" civil engineer
- A. H. Henning one of three AEI signatories to the Federal Convention, the others being V. L. Solomon and F. I. Crowder
- Edwin Sawle Hughes businessman and naturalist
- Levi Isaacs ( – November 1913)
- H. P. Ive (1866–1942), inspector of stock at Gepps Cross abattoirs
- Samuel Joshua Jacobs
- Frank Johnson, mayor of Adelaide
- James W. Jones secretary to the Commissioner of Public Works
- Robert Kelly
- Stephen King Jr. (Stuart Expedition 1861–1862)
- Charles Kingston "Charlie" later the Right Hon. C. C. Kingston
- Strickland Gough "Pat" Kingston (1848 – 3 October 1897) suicide
- G. Glen Legoe, businessman with George Wilcox & Co; son of John Legoe
- Ernest Edward Light and Walter Charles Arnold Light, sons of architect G. T. Light
- Isaac Little, manager Austral Downs station
- Sylvanus James Magarey politician
- Col. A. E. Marchant C.B., ADC to King George V
- Alfred Witter Marshall (1850 – 16 December 1915) son of S. Marshall of Marshall's Music Warehouse and continued with the business
- Henry Maydwell Martin (1846–1936) winemaker
- Mortimer Menpes artist
- Beaumont Arnold Moulden
- George Murray (later His Honour Sir George Murray, Chief Justice, Supreme Court of South Australia)
- Edward Andrew Devonshire Opie, land agent with G. W. Cotton as Cotton, Opie & Wark
- Caleb Peacock J. L. Young's first student, commencing August 1852
- Henry Furneaux Peacock (25 October 1850 – 6 February 1935) Under-Treasurer of S.A., son of Wiles Peacock, winegrower.
- W. Herbert Phillipps (later Sir Herbert Phillipps)
- William G. Pryor, owner of Mundillio station
- John H. Reid, of tannery, Hindmarsh
- Robert and William Robertson (owned Chowilla Station)
- Rev. James de Quetteville Robin and brother Roland
- William Sandover Jr. founded W. Sandover & Co.of Perth, W.A.
- F. G. Scammell, lawyer of Scammell, Hardy, and Skipper
- Luther Robert Scammell (1858–1940) of F. H. Faulding & Co
- W. J. Scammell, manager Faulding in Sydney
- Lionel H. Sholl, public servant
- W. J. Sims (c.1857–1891), manager, Bank of South Australia
- Spencer John Skipper wrote and drew as "Hugh Kalyptus"
- J. N. T. Smith, Education Department
- John Smith, grazier of Yackandandah
- Quinton Stow Smith
- R. W. Smith (Commissioner of Taxes)
- Benjamin Solomon (1844–1922) brother of V. L. Solomon
- Elias Solomon MLA, MHR
- Emanuel Solomon (1855–1938)
- Judah Moss Solomon (1846–1911)
- Samuel Solomon (1848–)
- Saul Solomon (the businessman not the photographer/MP)
- Vaiben Louis Solomon MLA, MHR
- John Styles, miller of Kadina
- Sir Robert Kyffin Thomas
- Samuel Toms, wholesaler
- Charles Tucker Mayor and MP; while customs agent for John Martin & Co. was found guilty of defrauding Customs Department after South Australia's longest criminal trial.
- Dr Joseph Cooke Verco, later Sir Joseph
- Walter H. Wadey, solicitor
- Alfred F. Weaver, stockbroker
- Arthur Wellington Ware mayor of Adelaide
- Dr. Edward Willis Way brother of Sir Samuel Way
- Thomas Playford Welbourn
- Alfred K. Whitby
- Frank Whitby of Mt. Remarkable
- Henry B. White and Richard B. White (leader of Philharmonic Society) drowned in Gulf St Vincent boating accident. They were sons of George White owner of White's assembly rooms.
- Arthur Onslow Whitington secretary of SAJC
- George Falkland Whitington (1842–1883), solicitor
- Peter Whitington, public servant
- Charles Fletcher Whitridge, secretary of China Inland Mission
- William Oswald Whitridge, cricketer and journalist with South Australian Register, both sons of W. W. R. Whitridge.
- Alfred Edgar Wigg (second son of Edgar S Wigg)
- Edward Neale Wigg (oldest son of E. S. Wigg)
- Sidney George Wilcox, pastoralist and director of George Wilcox & Co, helped found St Ann's College for female students at the University of Adelaide.
- Alfred Wilkinson (1863–1922), merchant who in 1894 purchased a controlling interest in the glass business of H. L. Vosz and developed it into the company that became A. E. Clarkson & Co.
- Charles Williams, of Lion Brewery, Waverley Brewery etc.
- Peter Wood, merchant of Rundle Street.
- Charles William Wren, General Manager E S & A Bank.
- George Spiller Wright (Inspector General of the State Bank)
- Thomas Young jun. mayor of Port Augusta, son of Thomas Young MHA (not related to J. L. Young)

== Old Scholars Association ==
(First AGM) held 15 Dec 1863 at Mr. J. L. Young's school room, Stephens-place; Mr. E. Cheetham occupied the chair. Satisfactory reports were received with reference to the success of the association. Annual prize awarded to Edward Neale Wigg. Elected: C. Peacock, President; M. L. Clark, Treasurer; Joseph Coulls, Secretary; and E. Cheetham, Walter Samson, Wm. Bickford, A. K. Whitby, and G. Cottrell.

== Prizegivings and examinations ==
J. L. Young held twice-yearly public demonstrations, mostly held in White's Rooms, which showcased the boys' accomplishments to parents and the public. A report was published as news in the newspapers immediately after, and always in glowing terms, the copy being provided by the school. Any flaws in the operation of the school and the training of eager young minds were only hinted at in retrospect – by pronouncements on the great strides made in the current year.

There were so many other schools that copied his example that the newspapers soon recognised these reports for what they were – advertisements – and charged by the column-inch. No longer were the speeches by the headmaster and the visiting dignitary quoted verbatim and, sadly for the historian, the only students named were the recipients of prizes.

== Sports ==
The school fielded a soccer team, two cricket teams and was a proponent of the Old Adelaide Football Club rules in 1865.

A game of football was played on the school grounds, Parkside, against North Adelaide Grammar on 17 May 1873. The score of nil-all suggests the game was soccer.

The first school Sports Day was held in November 1874. Prizes included silver pencil cases and gold shirt studs.

== Other Adelaide private schools of the period ==
This list is not exhaustive. Many schools changed location, identity and management. And there were many women of culture and attainment, particularly widows (such as Caroline Carleton), who subsisted on their earnings as tutors.

- Pastor Jacob Abbott, wife, daughter and son Joseph kept a school on Gilbert Street, opposite Draper Memorial Church.
- Adelaide Collegiate School in North Adelaide, run by Rev. Thomas Field. Incorporated into Queen's School 1892.
- Adelaide Model School (Alexander Clark) not strictly private school, run by Council of Education
- Albert House Academy – see Haire's Academy
- Alix House Academy, 100 South Terrace run by Eliza Hill (died October 1918), wife of Charles Hill, artist (died September 1915)
- Mrs. Bell's school
- Billiatt's Grammar School at St Leonards, Glenelg
- Bowden Day Schools (Methodist?) (Mr & Mrs Lawton)
- Brougham School, Gilles Street c. 1869 (Thomas Stevens Burgan, died 3 July 1858, succeeded by son Thomas Burgan, also at Fellenberg Commercial School)
- School run by W. A. Cawthorne on what was later Page Street, Adelaide, became Victoria Square Academy.
- Christ Church School run by James Bath, later Secretary to the Central Board of Education
- Church of England Collegiate School see St Peter's Collegiate School
- Classical Academy run by T. Q. Stow
- Classical and Commercial School for Young Gentlemen run J. McGowan, Grenfell-street, near Gawler-place
- Classical and English School run by the Rev. Ralph Drummond on Angas Street
- Classical, Mathematical and Commercial Academy, North Adelaide. Rev. J. B. Titherington and E. W. Wickes 1847–
- Collegiate and Commercial Institute, Victoria Square 1860 see Haire's academy
- Commercial School, Port Adelaide (Henry Nootnagel) later language master St Peter's College, later Prince Alfred College.
- Commercial School run by Mr. Hutchins in Hindley Street
- Deutsche Schule, Freeman St (von Schleinitz, then A. Hansen) 1851–52 then Flinders St to 1857; Wakefield Street, run by Theodor Niehuus and Adolph Leschen.
- Mr Dollison's school, Port Adelaide.
- Fellenberg Commercial School, Pulteney Street 1859–1861; Hindmarsh Square 1861–1866. Run by John Martin who moved to Melbourne, succeeded by James Morecott Holder ( – 1 November 1887) 1865–1866.
- Gawler Place Academy for Young Ladies (Mrs H. Thornley) 1853 (Mrs C. Thornley) 1853–1856 near Grenfell Street, later Victoria Square/Flinders Street
- Gawler Place Academy? (Mr J. Thornley) 1853
- Glenelg Educational Institution (J(ames) Mordey Mitchell)
- Glenelg Grammar (1868) Frederick Isaac Caterer (c. 1840 – c. 24 August 1892)
- Gouger Street Academy, James Hosking (c. 1822–1888)
- Grote Street Model School (coeducational – many female students prominent in Adelaide University examinations 1878)
- Haire's Academy, Albert House, Victoria Square then Collegiate Institute, Whitmore House, between Gilbert Street and South Terrace. (Francis Haire, died insolvent 1864)
- Hill House School (E. W. Wickes, later G. W. Moore)
- School run by Miss Hillier (later Mrs Taylor) North Terrace.
- Mrs. Hillier's school, Brighton (Mr. John Hillier was on Register staff)
- Mr Howard's Academy
- Infant School, run by Mrs. Gawler in Morphett Street
- James Jolly (died 3 November 1881)'s school in Waymouth Street (he later ran the Board of Education school at Encounter Bay then Port Elliot)
- Mr King's Academy, Port Adelaide
- St Leonards Grammar, Glenelg (W. K. Smart)
- Mr Leslie's School
- Mr McLaughlin's Public School, Port Adelaide
- Maesbury House School, Kensington, conducted by Septimus Webster c. 1857
- Mr. Martin's School, Pirie Street. 1852–1857, run by John Martin (c. 1814 – 9 July 1876), see also Fellenberg School above.
- Martin's Grammar School, Port Adelaide, conducted by Allen Martin (12 August 1844 – 13 July 1924) 1870–1876 then as a State school 1877–1900.
- Mr. Martin's school in two-storey house near the corner of Gilbert and King William streets.
- Miss Martin's School. Founded by Annie Montgomerie Martin. Second headmistress was Caroline Clark
- North Adelaide Classical and Commercial Academy (1847– ) John Berjew
- North Adelaide Educational Institution (aka Nesbit & Drews') (1869– ) http://nla.gov.au/nla.news-article41394776
- North Adelaide Grammar (John Whinham) (1804?-13 March 1886) and son Robert (died 24 October 1884) later called Whinham College.
- North Adelaide Seminar (1847– )
- Norwood Grammar School (Thomas Caterer) 1861 became South Australian Commercial College 1881
- Port Adelaide Grammar (A. Martin)
- Mr Potter's School
- Prince Alfred College (J. A. Hartley)
- Princes Street School (founded by James Cater, taken over by Department the following year with Cater as Head)
- Pulteney Street Academy (R. C. Mitton)
- Pulteney Street School (1848) (W. Moore) became Pulteney Grammar School
- Pulteney Street Central Schools (coeducational) 1847 (same as above?)
- Queen's School, later Queen's College, 149 Barton Tce, North Adelaide (1892–1949) was founded by J. H. Lindon and E. L. Heinemann, both ex-St Peter's College, taking over the bulk of the students of Rev. Thomas Field's Adelaide Collegiate School.
- Queenstown Commercial School
- Miss Roland's school on Tavistock Street
- Rundle Street Grammar (R. C. Mitton and W. J. Anderson) in Stephens Place from 1866 to 1872
- St Peter's Collegiate School (previously Church of England Collegiate School)
- Semaphore Collegiate School
- Mr Shepherdson's school in the Parklands, later kept by Mr Oldham for the South Australian School Society of London
- Stepney College
- Miss Tilney's school, Grote Street, later Franklin Street at Captain Finnis's house.
- Tranmere School, run by David Wylie, brother-in-law of William Scott MHR
- Union College (religious training)
- Victoria Square Academy – W. A. Cawthorne's school on west side of the Square.
- Way College – a Bible Christian college on Park Terrace, North Unley, named for Rev. James Way; W. G. Torr principal
- Wesleyan Day School, run by Mr. La Vence, in Franklin Street Wesleyan Chapel.
- Whinham College – see North Adelaide College
- Wickes and Titherington opened a school at Jeffcott Street 1847
- Mrs. Woodcocks Christ Church school room
- Young Ladies' School, run by Mrs. McGowan on Grenfell Street
- Young Ladies' Seminary, run by Mrs. Yates at Tavistock Buildings on Rundle Street
- Young Ladies' Seminary, run by Miss Williams on North Terrace
- Young Ladies' Seminary, run by Mrs. Quick on Stephens Place
- Young Ladies' Seminary, by Mrs. Chatfield on Cragie Place (off Gouger Street near Victoria Square)
