= Whitridge =

Whitridge is a surname, and may refer to:

- Frederick W. Whitridge (1852–1916), President of the Third Avenue Railway Company
- William Oswald Whitridge (1853–1919), Australian cricketer
- W. W. R. Whitridge (c.1824–1861), newspaper editor in South Australia

== See also ==
- SS Mary Whitridge
