= Dewhirst =

Dewhirst is a surname, and may refer to:

- Charlie Dewhirst (born 1980), British politician
- Edward Dewhirst (1815–1904), Australian minister and educationist
- Ian Dewhirst (born 1936), English historian and author
- Joan Dewhirst (born 1935), British figure skater
- John Dawson Dewhirst (1952–c.1978), British teacher and yachtsman
- James Dewhirst (born 1892, date of death unknown), English World War I flying ace
- Kym Winter-Dewhirst, Australian public servant
