= Gollin =

Gollin is a surname. Notable people with this name include:

- Alfred Gollin (1926–2005), American scholar of European history.
- George Gollin (born 1953), American physics professor at the University of Illinois
- Fabrizio Gollin (born 1975), Italian racing car driver
- Rita K. Gollin (born 1928), Professor of English at the State University of New York, an authority on Nathaniel Hawthorne
- Walter J. Gollin (1854–1927), Australian businessman, co-founder of merchants Gollin & Co

Other uses

- Gollin figure test is a psychologists' memory test
