= Ethel Ambrose =

Australian medical missionary

Ethel Mary Murray Ambrose (23 September 1874 – 17 February 1934) was an Australian medical practitioner. She spent 28 years as a medical missionary in India.

== History ==
Ambrose was a daughter of William Ambrose ( – 22 February 1882) and Helen Harvey Ambrose, née Finlayson (1846 – 8 June 1890), second daughter of William Finlayson. Both parents died at the Finlayson residence, "Helenholme" in Mitcham. John and Helen Finlayson cared for the three children. Ethel was educated at the prestigious Unley Park School, as was her elder sister Lily, while brother Theodore was educated at Way College.

In 1898 she topped the first class of the Medical School, winning the Elder Prize; In the same year her brother Theodore, a Way College alumnus, won the Elder prize for second year Medicine students.

She was awarded her MB and ChB from the University of Adelaide in 1903 at a special ceremony, and shortly took up a position with the Perth Hospital, as the first woman doctor on staff. According to one author she left Perth for Melbourne in early 1905 and became resident medical officer at Melbourne Hospital. Late that year she left for the mission at Nasrapur, where she stayed for some time, learning the language and customs. She then moved to Pandharpur, where missionaries were the only Europeans in town and worked from a small native building. Gradually the work increased, and they were able to establish a hospital and large dispensary. Through diligent attention they gradually became accepted by the community.

She returned to Adelaide every five years; one of these holidays was in 1919 at the time of the pneumonic influenza epidemic, when the Jubilee Exhibition Building was being used as an isolation hospital, and Ambrose was appointed the resident doctor.

On her 1932 visit she was troubled by ill-health, but returned to India before she had fully recovered. Her health deteriorated but she struggled on, waiting for a replacement who never arrived, and she died at Poona.

== Family ==
Following the early death of both parents, the children were brought up by grandfather Finlayson and two maiden aunts, presumably Jane (1837–1926) and Jessie (1850–1931).

- Lily Finlayson Ambrose (1873 – 1966) became a medical doctor
- Ethel Mary Murray Ambrose (23 September 1874 – 17 February 1934) became a medical doctor and missionary to India
- Helen Harvey Ambrose (1876 – 14 December 1950)
- William Searle Ambrose (1878 – 1962)
- Theodore Ambrose (1880 – 7 October 1947), became a medical doctor, moved to Perth
