= Rough-and-tumble =

Rough-and-tumble may refer to:

- Rough-and-tumble play
- Rough and tumble fighting
