= H. D. Gouge =

South Australia's first Government Actuary

Herbert Dillon Gouge (12 October 1843 – 11 November 1917) was South Australia's first Government Actuary.

== History ==
Gouge was born in Coventry and came to South Australia in 1850 with his father, and was educated at J. L. Young's Adelaide Educational Institution, then at St. Peter's College, where he proved a brilliant student.

His father Apollos Harrison Gouge, who died before 1914 and may have been born in Yale, British Columbia in 1826 after being proved insolvent several times was in 1859 appointed the contractor for the railway line to Kapunda then the pipeline from the Thorndon Park reservoir to the city and built the causeway between Victor Harbor and Granite Island. He donated and installed a drinking fountain at the junction of King William Street and Currie/Waymouth streets. The In 1861 an Act of Parliament was passed, granting him the right to build a railway from the Wallaroo mine to the Wallaroo jetty.
He was a musician and singer, performing at a couple of benefits for the explorer John McKinlay.
He was in 1857 the first to manufacture something like town gas in South Australia, and owned a tiger and an elephant.
He married May Ann Walsh in 1852; in 1863 he was charged with deserting his wife.

He exhibited a sketch Horse's Head with the South Australian Society of Arts at Adelaide in 1863, possibly as a student of Charles Hill. In the late 1860s he supervised construction of the Granite Island causeway for Borrow & Gouge, his father's contracting business. He worked as a land and commission agent in Wallaroo, then from 1868 to 1877 at Mannum, then in Adelaide. In 1885 he was licensed as an assessor under the Land and Income Tax Act. He was appointed Public Actuary on 16 March 1894, and was responsible for creating the office and its procedures.

He was a Fellow of the Royal Statistical Society, and was elected a corresponding member of the Statistical Society of Paris, on the nomination of M. Bellom, engineer with the French Department of Mines, and M. Le Nasseur, the president of the society.

He married Emily Mills (c. 1846 – 19 June 1936) on 31 May 1870; they had no children.
