= George Needham (teacher) =

George Needham B.A. (or A.B., T.C.D.) (c. 1804 – 19 March 1894) was a teacher in the early days of the colony of South Australia.

== History ==
Needham was born in Templemichael, County Longford, Ireland and graduated B.A. from Trinity College, Dublin. He taught in Ireland for some years before emigrating to South Australia aboard Anna, arriving with his wife and small family in November 1849. One daughter died shortly after arrival.

They had a home "Clendeliver" in Houghton, South Australia, and the Needhams opened a school in that town in 1853. A public school was opened in the town staffed by Government teachers, and Needham moved to Adelaide, where he served as Classics master at J. L. Young's Adelaide Educational Institution from at least 1859 to 1861. They had a residence on North Terrace, and offered board to AEI students on the same conditions as J. L. Young. One "old scholar" fondly remembered his scholarship and Hibernian humor. He returned to Houghton to teach at the village school. He resigned in December 1869.

In 1870 he was confined to his home as a result of a paralytic stroke, but continued to take private students.

== Family ==
George Needham (c. 1804 – 19 March 1894) married Catherine Elizabeth Montfort (c. 1810 – 24 May 1863) in Ireland. She was a daughter of Harman Montfort and Georgina Augusta Little. and claimed descent from Simon de Montfort. Their children included:

- Robert John Needham ( – 27 May 1904) died at "Oaklea", the home of Captain Elliott Charles Randall, Echuca, Victoria.
- Catherine ""Katie" Fleming Needham (c. 1844 – 7 November 1927) married Edward Tacey (died 1879) on 7 April 1866. She married again in 1884 to (Wesleyan Methodist) Rev. John Hosking Trevorrow, lived in Kapunda
- Georgina Anne Little Needham (1839 – 31 October 1931) married John William Partridge ( – ) of Clarendon on 1 September 1864. He was one of AEI's first students. They moved to New South Wales
- Harman Montfort Needham (1851 – August 1926) married Selina Olliver in 1884, lived in Broken Hill. He was encouraged by Spencer Skipper ("Hugh Kalyptus") to pursue a career in journalism, and wrote for various journals as "Paddy Melon". In 1891 he accepted a supervisory role at the Broken Hill mines, but continued writing for The Bulletin, and other papers as "Fitful".

Needham married again, to Mary Jones (c. 1820 – 10 August 1870) on 8 January 1868. She died two years later.

Rev. George Needham (c. 1791–1863) rector of Ballymore, County Wicklow, was an uncle
