= William Finlayson =

William Finlayson may refer to:

- William Finlayson (Australian politician) (1867–1955), Member of the House of Representatives for the seat of Brisbane 1910–1919
- William Finlayson (Canadian politician) (1874–1943), lawyer and political figure in Ontario
- William Finlayson (churchman) (1813–1897), churchman and farmer in the colony of South Australia
