= Rowland Harrold =

Rowland Edward Harrold MB., M.Chem (13 May 1865 – 6 November 1924) was a South Australian dermatologist and floriculturist.

== History ==
Harrold was born in South Australia, son of Henry Charles Harrold and his wife Sarah Catherine Harrold, née Peake, who married in 1858. He was educated at J. L. Young's Adelaide Educational Institution and at Glenelg Grammar School. On matriculating, he studied medicine at Edinburgh University, graduating Bachelor of Medicine and Master of Chemistry, then took up a position at St. Bartholomew's Hospital, London, as assistant to Dr. Morell Mackenzie.

He returned to Australia in 1892, when he started to practise as a General Practitioner. In 1910 he returned to England to study dermatology under Dr. James Harry Sequeira (1865 - 1948), and the following year returned to Adelaide, where apart from practising his speciality he was appointed honorary dermatologist at the Adelaide Hospital, a position he retained until his death.

He died after a stroke, which followed three months seriously ill at home.

== Other interests ==
Harrold was a keen bowler, a founding member of the Adelaide Drive Bowling Club, and represented South Australia at a number of interstate contests.

He was an ardent floriculturist and president of the South Australian Carnation Society for many years. He generally had in his buttonhole one of his own carnations or delphiniums.

== Family ==
Harrold married Marion Walker Hamilton (1868–1958) on 1 May 1894, and went to live at "Strathearn" on East Terrace, Adelaide, previously the Hamilton family home and the residence of her brother A. E. Hamilton. They had one daughter Joyce Harrold (1898– ), who married Rex Cooper, in Colombo on 18 June 1924.
