= Eye-gouging (Gaelic football) =

Eye-gouging is a serious offence in Gaelic games where a player uses hands or fingers to inflict pain in an opponent's eyes. Such incidents are usually referred to as "eye-gouging" among players and in the media.

== History ==
Colm O'Rourke, a player from the 1970s onwards, wrote this in 2022 for the Sunday Independent: "I was involved in quite a few skirmishes at club level but at that time there were basic rules of engagement. Anyone who kicked, spat or headbutted was fair game for a good hiding, but I had never heard of gouging until it became a problem in rugby".

== Incidents ==
2013 All-Ireland Senior Football Championship semi-final at Croke Park: Dublin's Rory O'Carroll in a photograph looking like he is gouging the eye of Colm Cooper as he lay on the ground while Jonny Cooper held his shoulder. In a photograph was much publicised at that time. Manager Jim Gavin investigated but was pleased O'Carroll had no problem to answer for. But, with only the Sportsfile photograph of O'Carroll's index finger in Cooper's left eye and a lack of video evidence, O'Carroll was cleared to play in the 2013 All-Ireland Senior Football Championship Final.

2015 All-Ireland Senior Football Championship Final: Dublin's Philly McMahon v Kieran Donaghy, McMahon banned for one game. McMahon told Morning Ireland: "This is Gaelic football. We're grown men, we play a physical sport and at the end of the day the result is what ends it and we shake hands and get on with it." Tomás Ó Sé and Ciarán Whelan downplayed the incident on The Sunday Game highlights programme. Donaghy filmed for documentary saying McMahon gouged him in the eyes.

2016 National Football League: Dublin again, Croke Park again, this time James McCarthy looking like he is gouging the eye of a Donegal player, Martin McElhinney in an incident that brought back memories of Patrick McBrearty being bitten in 2013. McCarthy, who had actually just been shown a red card before he did this, escaped punishment and Dublin manager Jim Gavin said: "To be suggesting there was something malicious, I don't think that's very fair." The Irish Independent called for McCarthy to be investigated. But the incident was dismissed as a push by Setanta Sports pundits Senan Connell (former Dublin player) and Aaron Kernan (former Armagh player, see below) dismissed the incident as a push.

Related incidents include Paul Galvin's two-month ban for attacking the face of Eoin Cadogan in the 2010 Munster semi-final replay.

Armagh v Galway (2022 All-Ireland Senior Football Championship): Incident picked up straight away on live television. Former Tyrone All-Ireland SFC winner Owen Mulligan defended the eye-gouging. Joe Brolly did not, he said: "The eye-gouger, no doubt, will get 12 months as a minimum... Possibly longer than that. It is a scandal to see that in our games, deeply depressing." Even hurlers spoke out against it. The incident was satirised by Waterford Whispers News. Colm Keys wrote in the Irish Independent that "The stigma of the eye-gouge will follow Armagh around for some time".

== See also ==
- Eye-gouging (rugby union)
