= Unbehaun =

Unbehaun is a surname. Notable people with the surname include:

- Carl Albert Unbehaun (1851–1924), Australian electrical engineer
- Luca Unbehaun (born 2001), German footballer
