= Edward Dewhirst =

Australian educator (1815–1904)

Edward Dewhirst (30 August 1815 – 4 February 1904) was a well-known South Australian minister of religion and educationist, born in Suffolk, England. His five children were also prominent in business and public life.

== Early years ==
Edward Dewhirst was born in 1815, the third son of Rev. Charles Dewhirst, Independent (as Congregationalists often styled themselves) minister of Bury St Edmunds, Suffolk, England. He was educated there at King Edward VI Grammar School, having classics instruction from the headmaster John William Donaldson. In 1833 he was articled to a surgeon and started studying medicine, but in 1836 sailed for Jamaica in the West Indies where he worked for two or three years, and made the acquaintance of Rev. Matthew Henry Hodge. He suffered from a fever, and returned to England, where he studied to become a Nonconformist minister under John Pye-Smith at Homerton College, Cambridge.

In 1849 Dewhirst married Mary Ann, the eldest daughter of the Rev. Thomas Jarvis of Saint Helier, Jersey, Channel Islands.

== In Australia ==
He emigrated to Victoria in 1853, where he worked as a Baptist minister, moving to South Australia in 1855 as a minister, first Baptist then Congregational at the Ebenezer Place church and filling in as Classics master at J. L. Young's Adelaide Educational Institution. His wife followed, arriving in the Libertas in 1857, accompanied by two sisters.

He received a licence to perform marriages in January 1857, but relinquished it in October 1858 when he joined the literary staff of The Register. One of his duties was writing for Farm and Garden, which must have suited him as he was a keen gardener. In August 1860 he was appointed second Inspector of Schools with the South Australian Education Department, where his kindly ways endeared him to both staff and students, although his philosophy of sound learning in a few subjects was at odds with the prevailing trend of less intense teaching over a broad range. When J. A. Hartley, who had similar ideas, was made Inspector-General of Schools he was promoted to Senior Inspector of Schools. In June 1891 he retired to the Adelaide Hills town of Nairne, where he was able to indulge his passions for literature, cricket and gardening, and became a valued member of the community, dying there in 1904.

== Family life ==
His wife Mary Ann Dewhirst (7 November 1823 – 17 August 1913), née Jarvis, was born in Saint Helier where they married. She followed him to Adelaide in 1857. She was for many years deaconess of the North Adelaide Baptist Church and taught at their women's Bible class. They had five children:

- Edward Nicolle Dewhirst (ca.1851 – 12 September 1935), born at Guernsey, Channel Islands, was manager of the National Australia Bank at Port Adelaide. He was educated at Adelaide Educational Institution and St Peter's College, went farming at Modbury, worked for the Public Stores Department and worked in Port Darwin for three years, returning in 1875. He had booked his return passage on the SS Gothenburg, but a delay in issuing his papers forced him to miss this ill-fated voyage, probably saving his life. At the age of around 25 he joined the Adelaide branch of the National Bank, and by 1894 was manager of the Port Adelaide branch, retiring in 1914. Edward was a fine baritone and was a choirmaster at Port Augusta Presbyterian Church; was a member and past president of the Port Adelaide Orpheus Society. He was for several years president of the Port Adelaide Institute. He was an enthusiastic yachtsman and raced the yacht Doris which he built in his backyard at Port Augusta. He was a member and one-time commodore of the Royal South Australian Yacht Squadron.

On 6 May 1878 he married Emily Ward (ca.1854 – 25 April 1879), third daughter of Thomas Ward, City Coroner.
On 16 February 1881, he married Annie Rosina Rumball (ca.1861 – 3 June 1941) of Port Augusta, but originally from Canada.

- Marianna Dewhirst, later Mrs. J. Langdon Parsons (1852 – 31 December 1937)

4 August 1877 she married the Rev. (later Hon.) John Langdon Parsons (died 21 August 1903)

- Evangeline Dewhirst, later Mrs. H. Hayes Norman (27 July 1853 – 28 April 1932)

24 April 1877 she married Dr. Herbert Hayes Norman, D.D.S. (21 July 1843 – 19 January 1926)

- Thomas Youngman Dewhirst (5 February 1859 – 11 January 1927) was educated at Nesbit and Drews' North Adelaide Educational Institution, started work as a warehouseman then solicitor's clerk, then joined the electrical staff of the Adelaide General Post Office, under C. A. Unbehaun. He was a prominent yachtsman, a longtime member of the Royal South Australian Yacht Squadron (he lived in nearby Coppin Street, Semaphore) and was for many years its honorary secretary.

On 5 August 1886 he married Florence Amy Allen (ca.1857 – 1 November 1939).

- Charles Hay Dewhirst (ca.1862 – 13 January 1939), entered the Public Service in 1878 and in 1892 was promoted to chief clerk in the office of the Commissioner of Public Works. He was secretary and chief executive officer of the South Australian Supply and Tender Board from 1899 and in 1914 he was made a member of the board, and later deputy chairman. In 1923 he was appointed Government member of the Municipal Tramways Trust. In 1928 he was awarded the Imperial Service Order. He was forced by ill-health to retire early and spent his last eight years an invalid. In his youth he was a successful racing cyclist and an early member of the Royal South Australian Yacht Squadron. He owned, with his brother Thomas Youngman Dewhirst, the three-tonner Desire, one of the most successful small boats on the Port River. In 1886, he was chosen by Alex Wyllie to skipper his yacht Alexa and for a time won almost every thing she was entered for.

On 6 March 1885 he married Elizabeth "Lizzie" "Bell" Currie (died 5 December 1942), daughter of James Currie. Their only child, Norman H. Dewhirst died around 1910.
