= Hermann von Schleinitz =

Hermann Carl von Schleinitz ( – c. 17 January 1877) was an educator in the early days of the colony of South Australia. He founded Adelaide's first German School.

== History ==
Schleinitz was born in Germany the only son of an Oberfurstmeister (forestry supervisor) and cousin of Baron Alexander von Schleinitz. He was educated at the universities of Leipzig and Greifswald, and was himself an officer in the Forestry Service. After the failed students' revolt of 1848, in which he took the liberal side, he found his politics detrimental to his career prospects, and emigrated to South Australia, arriving in Adelaide aboard Pauline from Bremen in December 1849. For several years he was clerk to C. Schilling, landbroker of Gawler Place.

In 1851 he founded a German School in Freeman Street (now the stretch of Gawler Place between Grenfell and Wakefield streets), catering to boys and girls, both native-born English and German speakers, English classes being taken by Henry Nootnagel. In March 1852 he was naturalized as a British subject; that same year had J. C. Hansen took over his school "during Mr. Schleinitz's temporary absence." The Deutsche Schule moved to Flinders Street and was still in operation under Hansen in 1857.

Johann Christian Hansen (c. 1814 – 10 May 1885) was one of the first teachers licensed in South Australia, was born in Prussia. He emigrated to South Australia aboard Australia, arriving in May 1849. He ran the German School on Freeman Street during von Schleinitz's absence, later ran schools in Pirie Street and at his home in Arthur Street, Unley. He also excelled as an organist, composer, chess player and composer of mathematical puzzles. He returned to Germany c. 1877 and died in Jardelund, close to his birthplace Osterby, both near Flensburg in Schleswig-Holstein.

Schleinitz's whereabouts from 1852 have yet to be discovered; he reappeared in 1863 in his previous role as a commission agent in Gawler Place. Between 1864 and 1873 he took French and German classes at Adelaide Educational Institution, St Peter's College and Norwood Grammar School, then, finding the constant travelling a strain on his incipient lameness, restricted his teaching to classes at his North Terrace, east, home, where he had been taking evening classes from July 1866.

His successor at St. Peter's College was (Karl or Carl) Emil Jung LLD (1833–1902), formerly of Tanunda, and later Inspector of Schools. He returned to Germany around 1875 and there published Der Welttheil Australien, "The Australian region", (four volumes), English abridgement published in one volume as Australia: The Country and its Inhabitants.

By 1876 he was advertising for employment: anything, anywhere. He died early the following year, and his remains buried in the West Terrace Cemetery.
