= James R. Parsons =

Australian educator (c1839–1905)

James Ranelagh Ponsonby Parsons (c. 1839 – 9 August 1905) was a South Australian educator.

Parsons was born in Ireland, the son of Henry Parsons of Trim, County Meath. In 1848 he accompanied his parents to Tasmania, where he spent his early years. In 1875, he moved to South Australia, where he held positions on the teaching staffs of Moonta school, and in Adelaide, St Peter's College, J. L. Young's Adelaide Educational Institution (in Parkside), principal of Adelaide High School, in 1880 and from 1882, Frederick Caterer's Glenelg Grammar School. He then founded the Collegiate School in Broadstairs Street, also in Glenelg.

He was an active churchman and for many years a lay reader, conducting services at St Jude's, Brighton when it was without a permanent minister. His brother, Samuel Parsons, was incumbent of All Saints' and Canon of St David's, Hobart.

Parsons married Sarah Cole Wells (died 1 October 1913). Their children include

- Their eldest daughter, Emmeline Rutherford Parsons married Alfred Ernest Belcher in 1895.
- Rachel Cole Ponsonby Parsons, died in 1939.
- Henrietta Hannah Maude Parsons married Ellis
- Sarah Louise Ponsonby Parsons (born 1876)
- Cathleen Hilda Australie Ponsonby Parsons (born 1880)

Parsons died at the age of 66 years at his residence in Glenelg, after a long illness, leaving a widow and a grown-up family.
