= Charles Mallen =

Carpenter and brewer (1819–1909)

Charles Edward Mallen (23 December 1819 – 26 October 1909) was a carpenter and brewer in the early days of the colony of South Australia.

== History ==
Charles was born at Euston Square, London, and was apprenticed to the Edwards company, cabinetmakers to the Royal Family, where his father and brother were employed all their lives.

He and his family emigrated to South Australia aboard the steamer Champion in December 1854, and for a time was employed at his trade, producing ornamental work for the Wesleyan Church, Pirie street, and Faulding's chemist shop. He purchased some land in Angas Street and five acres at Clapham, where he built a home. He then worked for Mellor Brothers, agricultural machinists, and while with them was given a job to repair a malt crusher at W. H. Clark's brewery on Halifax Street.

Clark then moved to the West End Brewery, Hindley Street, which ultimately became the property of John Haimes, and Charles was kept busy making plant and connecting machinery for the new brewery.

Then W. K. Simms purchased the business and put Charles on the permanent staff. Next Edgar Chapman joined the business as Simms & Chapman and Charles was appointed brewer and manager.

In 1874 they sent him to New South Wales to select a location for a new brewery. He settled on the town of Waverley, near Sydney, and there on Edgecliffe Road built the "Adelaide Brewery", where he brewed the first beer in December 1874, and was very successful, and in 1875 enlarged the cellars.

Charles left the company after being refused a partnership in the firm, and returned to Adelaide, where he purchased land on West Terrace, and built a small brewery on the Gilbert Street corner, which he (cheekily?) named "Waverley Brewery", which started operation in December 1875, and was purchased by Simms in 1876, to become Waverley Vinegar Works.

He then purchased a property on Unley Road, Lower Mitcham, near the Brownhill Creek, and in 1878 in conjunction with Haimes built the "Waverley Brewery", operated by Haimes, Mallen & Co., which consisted of John Haimes, Charles Mallen, Charles's daughter Maria Mallen and Arthur Bean, who retired in 1879.

Charles Williams was appointed Manager around 1921 and occupied that position until 1933, when he retired due to ill health.

"Waverley Brewery" ceased operation in the 1930s, but the Mallen family continued as hotel operators well into the late 20th century.

Mallen & Co. Ltd. owned 13 hotels in and around Adelaide:

- Alma Hotel at Norwood
- Britannia Hotel at Port Adelaide
- Carrington Hotel in Carrington Street, Adelaide
- Colac Hotel at Port Adelaide
- Emu Hotel at Morphett Vale
- Edinburgh Hotel at Mitcham
- Gilles Arms Hotel in Gilles Street, Adelaide
- Hilton Hotel at Hilton
- Holdfast Hotel at Glenelg
- Maylands Hotel at Maylands
- Northern Hotel at Enfield
- Waverley Hotel at Unley
- West Thebarton Hotel at Thebarton

The Springfield Brewery was established on the site on the corner of Princes Street and Bull's Creek Road, Mitcham around 1938, greatly expanded in 1941. By 1954 the company was in liquidation.

The "Adelaide Brewery" at Edgecliffe Road, Waverley, New South Wales, did not survive long. By 1880 they had stopped advertising, and in 1901 the property was subdivided.

== Other activities ==
As a youth, Charles participated in various sports, and later was involved in racing horses and greyhounds, winning four Waterloo Cups, though he never placed a wager on the outcome of any race.

Horses he bred include Lancelot and Modjeska, who won some races.

== Family ==
Charles married Maria Matilda Sandwell (25 April 1817 – 10 November 1900) in London on 29 June 1840. They had 9 children.
