= Walter J. Gollin =

Australian businessman (1854–1927)

- Born: Walter Josephson Gollin; 1854
- Died: May 1927 (aged 72–73)

Walter Josephson Gollin (1854 – May 1927) was a businessman, co-founder of merchants Gollin & Co. of Adelaide, Melbourne and Sydney.

== History ==
Gollin was born in Adelaide the eldest son of Bezaleel Gollin (c. 1818 – 7 December 1874) and his wife Eliza Gollin, née Barnard, who married on 17 August 1853. Bezaleel had arrived in South Australia from England aboard Thomas Lowry in December 1848; Eliza arrived on Eden June 1838 with her widowed mother Elizabeth Merritt. He was educated at J. L. Young's Adelaide Educational Institution, then joined his father's mercantile brokerage business, which he and his brother George Gollin (1860 – July 1946) took over on their father's death. George shortly left for London, to manage business at that end.

At first Gollin & Co. ran its operations from offices in the Widows' Fund Building, Grenfell Street, then in 1897 moved to larger premises in the Brookman Building, also on Grenfell Street. Around the same time W. J. Gollin left for Sydney and with a Liverpool cousin founded a Sydney branch.

In 1889 a Melbourne branch was founded, and in 1901 the company was restructured as Gollin & Co., Proprietary Limited, with its headquarters from 1902 at 561–563 Bourke Street, Melbourne, with branches in Sydney, Adelaide and London, later Brisbane, Perth, and four major cities in New Zealand. The Melbourne headquarters was a five-storey building designed by Charles D'Ebro and built by Clements Langford.

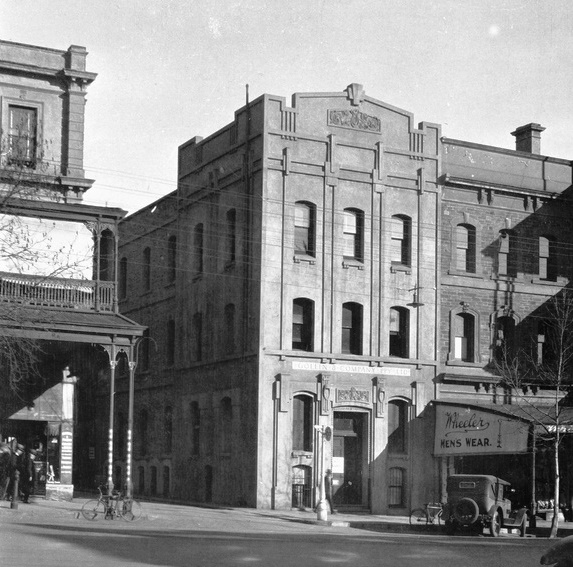
Gollin & Co, North Tce. c. 1923 On left is Gresham Hotel

In 1906 a new building on North Terrace was erected for the Adelaide branch, whose rapid expansion could be attributed to its manager, Thomas Edwin Crompton.

By 1927 it had 200 agencies around the world. A wide variety of commodities was traded: from importing Michelin tyres, oil and kerosene to export of fruit from Mildura to England.

W. J. Gollin lived in London for much of his later life, and retired from business around 1925.

The company became a subsidiary of Gollin Holdings Limited, incorporated in Victoria on 30 August 1957. The company went into liquidation on 30 June 1976.

== Family ==
Gollin married Adelaide Rachel "Ada" Raphael (7 August 1857 – 17 November 1929) on 12 November 1879. They had a home "Farleigh" on LeFevre Terrace, North Adelaide, left for Sydney c. 1897.

- Esther Stella Gollin (29 January 1881 – 15 June 1948) married Arthur Temple Blackwood RN on 31 October 1905. She married again, to Cecil Gordon Canning, on 29 September 1925.
- (Beatrice) Daisy Gollin (1 April 1882 – 1963) married Frank Osborne of Bungendore, New South Wales on 30 November 1904
- Leslie Gollin (26 May 1883 – 14 November 1886), their only son
