= A. E. Hamilton =

Australian public accountant

Albert Edwin "Bert" Hamilton (1873–1962) was a South Australian public accountant who had a significant involvement with several major institutions.

== History ==
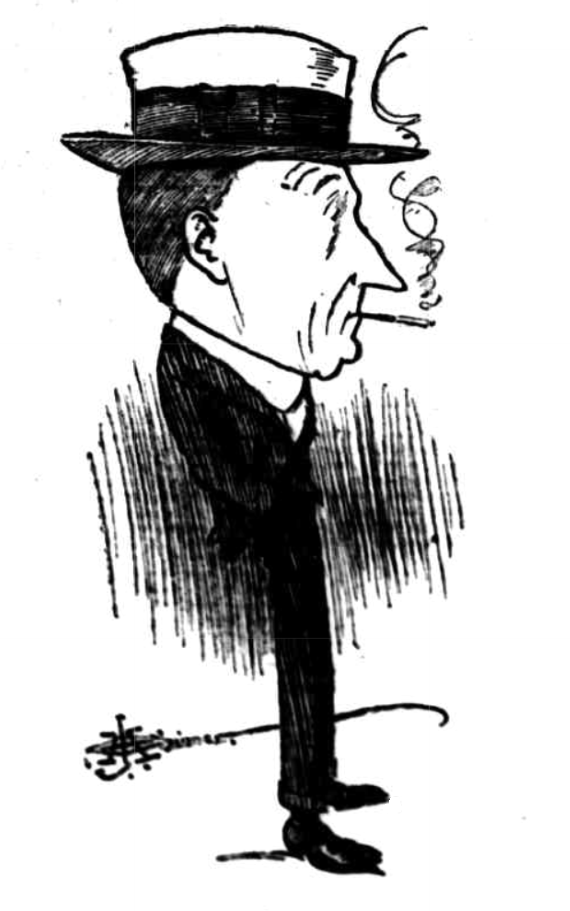
Caricature by J. H. Chinner

Hamilton was the younger son (Note: Henry Arthur Hamilton, born Adelaide 1872, son of William Hamilton, also a prize-winning student at P.A.C., he died of typhus in Perth at age 24.) of pastoralist William Hamilton (1830 – 16 June 1911) and Annie Hamilton (c. 1839 – 5 August 1903) of "Strathearn" East Terrace, Adelaide. He was partners with George Wilcox in Koonamore Station, and with Samuel Mills in Lake Everard, Chandada, Beetaloo, Teetulpa and Yackara stations.

Hamilton was educated at Prince Alfred College, a consistent prize-winning student and athlete 1882–1889. He studied wool classing and sheep breeding at the School of Mines and Industries, Adelaide. During the Great War, he served as a paymaster, and in September 1917 promoted to major in command of the Australian Army Pay Corps, 4th Military District.

=== Pastoral ===
He inherited his father's position in the firm of Hamilton & Wilcox, Ltd, managers of Koonamore sheep station near Waukaringa, South Australia. The company was wound up voluntarily in September 1928. Hamilton and Sidney Wilcox were appointed liquidators.

He was a member of the Royal Agricultural and Horticultural Society council from 1905 and chairman of the pastoral committee in 1908. He was appointed the pastoral committee's representative on the executive council in 1914 and a member of the finance committee in 1915. He was a vice-president from 1923 to 1925, and chairman of the showground committee 1927–1928.

He was a member of the South Australian Stockowners' Association from 1917 to 1948, vice president and treasurer then president 1923–1925.

=== Motoring ===
In 1915 he was appointed chairman of directors of Cheney Motor Company Limited, Adelaide distributors of Dodge Brothers cars. In 1916 accompanied S. A. Cheney (founder) and T. E. L. Moncrieff (manager) in a Dodge car to Melbourne. The company, renamed Waymouth Motor Company in 1922, retained the franchise in 1932 when the Chrysler corporation, which also made Plymouth and De Soto cars, took over Dodge. He was still chairman in 1954 when Chrysler Australia Ltd. started making cars in South Australia.

He was in September 1923 a foundation director of Automobile Finance Company, Limited.

=== Bank of Adelaide ===
He was elected to the Bank of Adelaide board in 1934 following the death of A. G. Rymill. and was still a member in 1952.

=== Other businesses ===
He was also director of:

- South Australian Woollen Co. Ltd., and its successor Onkaparinga Woollen Co. Ltd. operating the factory at Lobethal.
- Bagot, Shakes. & Lewis. Ltd.
- J. Kitchen & Sons, Ltd.
- South Australian Woollen Co., Ltd.
- Clarence H. Smith. Ltd.
- Goldsbrough Mort
- Bagot's Executor Trustee
- SA Brewing Co. Ltd.

== Professional ==
He worked as a public accountant with offices in Steamship Buildings Currie Street, Adelaide He was elected to the Australasian Corporation of Public Accountants in 1914.

He was president, Institute of Accountants, 1914

== Personal ==
Hamilton was a rose fancier, and foundation member and vice-president of the National Rose Society of SA when it was re-formed in 1928.

He was a member of the Adelaide Botanic Garden board of governors.

He lived at the old family residence, "Strathearn" on East Terrace, where also lived his sister Marion and her husband, the dermatologist Dr Rowland Harrold. He never married.

== Recognition ==
Hamilton was made an MBE in 1920 and awarded an OBE in 1950 "for services to the Stockowners' Association and the Royal Agricultural and Horticultural Society of South Australia."

The A. E. Hamilton Scholarship of two years' free tuition at Prince Alfred College, (first awarded 1937) was named for him.
