= Charles Williams (brewer) =

Australian brewer

Charles Williams (1850 – 11 April 1936) was head brewer for several notable Australian companies.

== Career ==
Williams was born in Wakefield Street, Adelaide, son of John Williams (c. 1806 – 29 June 1876), a brewer. He was educated at J. L. Young's Adelaide Educational Institution, then started work at his father's brewery at Angas Park (founded 1858) and ran that business for a few years after his father's death before it was liquidated.

Williams was then appointed head brewer for the Black Horse brewery, Ballarat, and subsequently for Henry Leggo & Son's brewery in the same town. He returned to Adelaide as head brewer of the Lion Brewing and Malting Company. He was also head brewer for the Walkerville Cooperative Brewing Co. In 1901 he founded Williams Brewery Ltd, at Walkerville, where he was a senior partner in the firm, but retired some years later. John Tothill, later proprietor of S. A. Brewing Company's Mount Gambier brewery, served under him for several years at the company's Broken Hill and Laura breweries.

He was appointed manager of the Waverley Brewery at Mitcham around 1921, and he occupied that position for 12 years before resigning in 1933 due to ill health. At that time he was reckoned to be the oldest brewer still active in Australia.

He died at his home, Wood Street, Millswood.

== Family ==
Charles Williams married Eliza Lehman (1851–1928) on 6 December 1871.

- Lilian Grace Elizabeth Williams (11 September 1872 – 14 December 1950)
- Ella Eliza Williams (1874–1955)
- Charles Egerton Stanley Williams (1876 – 18 January 1904) He trained as a brewer and would have taken over from his father had he lived longer.
- Violet May Williams (1878 – 23 June 1945)

Their three daughters were active in the Cheer-Up Society and never married. His sister Maria Williams (c. 1839 – 28 June 1914) married John Moody (1831–1916) in 1856. He was a prominent businessman.
