= Charles Hill (painter) =

Australian painter (1824–1915)

Charles Hill (1824 – 16 September 1915) was an engraver, painter and arts educator in South Australia.

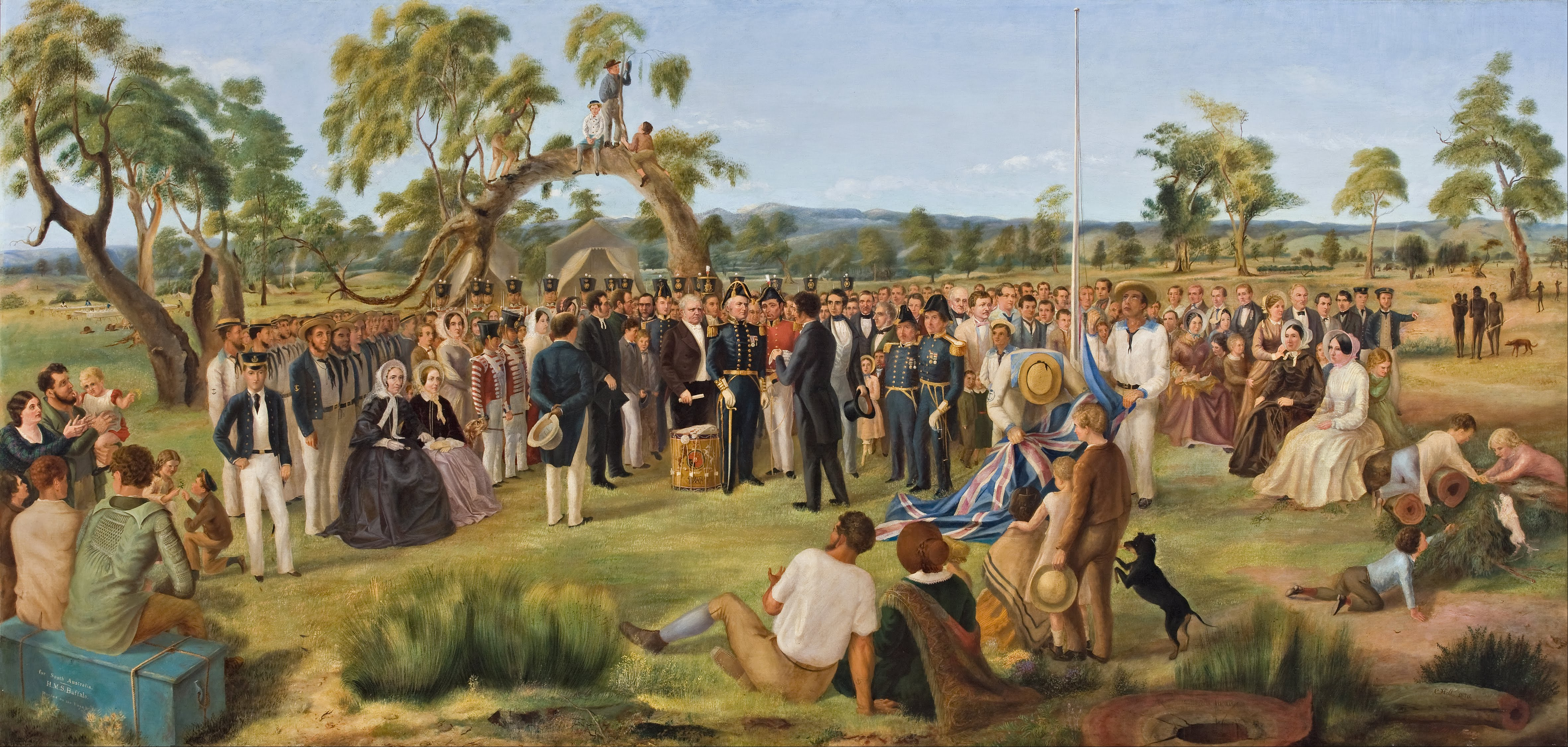
The Proclamation of South Australia 1836, Charles Hill.

== History ==
Hill was born in Coventry, England; his father was an officer who served under Lord Wellington, and served at Badajoz, Salamanca, Vitoria, and Toulouse, and was later the reforming Governor of Leicester County Prison. Charles was more interested in art than a military career, and served an apprenticeship as line engraver to Mark Lambert in Newcastle upon Tyne. In 1840 he enrolled in the Newcastle Fine Arts Academy and took lessons at the Government School of Design with W. B. Scott, later editor of The Art Journal. He helped mount the posthumous exhibition of David Scott's works. He produced the engraving The Choristers after Barraud. He was one of those responsible for the famous engraving which depicted the opening of The Crystal Palace in 1851.

Hill emigrated to South Australia on the recommendation of Archdeacon Farr (1819–1904), in the hope that a change of climate would be good for his health, arriving on the Historia in 1854. He found employment as art teacher at St. Peter's College also J. L. Young's Adelaide Educational Institution, Mrs. Woodcocks Christ Church school room, at Miss Roland's school on Tavistock Street, and later Mrs. Bell's school. He opened his own School of Art in his home in Pulteney Street in 1856. Wilton Hack succeeded Hill as drawing master in 1868 at both St. Peter's and AEI. It was largely due to the efforts of Hill and W. W. R. Whitridge that the South Australian Society of Arts was formed; the first meeting held to establish the Society was held at his home. He moved to "Alix House", 100 South Terrace around 1866, their home for fifty years. When the Society of Arts and the South Australian Institute founded the South Australian School of Design in 1861, he was chosen as its first Master, a role he maintained through several changes of name and focus, until he retired around 1886.

He was an active member of the South Australian Volunteer Force, and was an expert marksman. He was also a member of Adelaide's Bohemian Club.

== Works ==
Notable paintings by Charles Hill include:

- Wreck of the Admella, donated to the Art Gallery of South Australia's historic collection by the artist's grandson H. L. Hill in 1944. depicting the famous shipwreck.
- The Proclamation of South Australia 1836, has been on display at Government House since 2024, and is the subject of a monograph by historian Susan Marsden.
- The Artist and His Family
- The Back Garden, c.1870 held by the National Gallery of Australia view here

== Family ==
He married Eliza Georgina Jane Proctor (c.1830 – 31 August 1918) of Boston, Lincolnshire on 4 April 1852. Their children included:

- Dr. Charles Edward Hill D.D.S. ( – 29 January 1933) born in Montreal; dental surgeon in Port Melbourne, retired to Williamstown, Victoria. He married Emma Lena (Elena?) ( – ). Their children included:

- Roland Edward Alix Hill (c. September 1889 – )
- (Charles) Edgar George Hill (1891–)
- (Alfred) Wallace Hill (c.1895 – 16 August 1918) killed in France.
- Hector Hill ( – )

- (William) Henry "Harry" Hill (17 November 1861 – 29 October 1946) married Clara Balfort Shephard (c.1862 – 24 February 1914) on 5 December 1887. He was Locomotive Superintendent at Murray Bridge, later at Petersburg (modern Peterborough) He died at the Box Hill, Victoria home of his eldest son Harry.
- (George) Alfred Hill (31 Dec 1863 – 1 May 1936) married Evelyn Sarah Lewis ( – ) on 27 March 1889. He was engineer of Melbourne, later Islington Railway Workshops, home at 7 Vine Street, Prospect.
- George Felix Alix Hill ( – ) married Cecilia Theuff ( – ) on 2 August 1893; they divorced 1912. He had a dental practice in Collins Street, Melbourne, then 14 Vincent Street, Port Adelaide
- Henrietta Susannah Hill (c.1853 – 22 October 1947) married inn-keeper Henry Kewson ( – 2 January 1876) of Rhynie on 20 June 1874 (Sarah Jane (c.1841–1872) was his previous wife). She married again, to Herbert Bode (c.1852 – 14 August 1935) of Wasleys
- Jessie Hill (c. 1858 – 20 August 1875)
- Harriet Eliza Susannah Alix Hill (c.1866 – 14 February 1925) married teacher William Luke (c. 1869 – 10 June 1919) on 24 December 1892, lived at Macclesfield, Jamestown then Kadina.
- Georgina Hill ( – 7 August 1945), lived Barton Terrace, North Adelaide
