= Mount Barker (South Australia) =

Mountain in South Australia

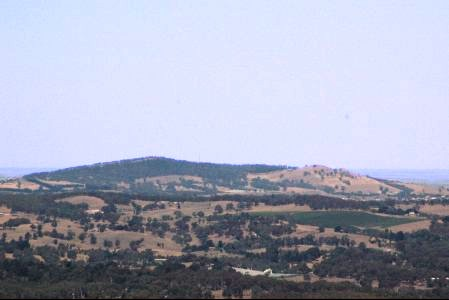
- Mount Barker, as seen from Mount Lofty

Highest point
- Elevation: 517 m (1,696 ft)AHD
- Coordinates: 35°03′58″S 138°55′16″E

Geography
- Country: Australia
- State: South Australia
- Parent range: Mount Lofty Ranges

Climbing
- First ascent: 1837 (but likely ascended by Peramangk people before European contact)
- Easiest route: short walk from carpark at the end of Summit Road

Mount Barker is a mountain in the Mount Lofty Ranges in South Australia and namesake of the nearby town of Mount Barker.

The mountain is the home to a transmission tower that services SAGRN and mobile phone transmissions throughout the area. Microwave radio equipment is also installed on the tower, providing various forms of communication such as broadband internet connections and voice services to Mount Barker residents and businesses.

== History ==
Mount Barker was first sighted by Captain Charles Sturt in 1830, although he thought he was looking at the previously discovered Mount Lofty. Captain Collet Barker fixed this error when he surveyed the area in 1831. Sturt named the mountain in honor of Captain Barker after he was killed days later by local Aboriginal people.

The first Europeans to ascend the mountain, on 27 November 1837, were a six-man party comprising John Barton Hack, John Morphett, Samuel Stephens, Charles Stuart (South Australian Company's stock overseer), Thomas Davis (Hack's stockman), and John Wade (a "gentleman from Hobart Town").

A counterclaim that the first Europeans to scale the summit were Robert Cock, William Finlayson, A(dolphus) Valentine Wyatt and George Barton late in December 1837 is not credible. That is because Morphett had a letter published on 28 December 1837 in a Sydney newspaper reporting that the summit had been scaled one month earlier.

== Culture ==
There are a few short walking trails available on the summit, beginning at the summit car park. There are picnic tables on the main walking trail halfway between the car park and the summit proper. There is an additional circuit trail at the base of the mountain.
