= Mandisa Williams =

- Born: 8 November 1984 (age 42) Jongilanga, Bushbuckridge Municipality, Mpumalanga, South Africa
- Occupation: Commentator

Rugby union career
- Position: Number 8
Senior career
Years	Team	Apps	(Points)
1999–2016	Imonti Penguins		
Provincial / State sides
Years	Team	Apps	(Points)
2000-16	Border		
International career
Years	Team	Apps	(Points)
2004–16	South Africa		
National sevens team
Years	Team		Comps
2016	South Africa		

Mandisa Williams (born 8 November 1984) is a retired South African women's rugby union player from Jongilanga, Bushbuckridge Municipality, Mpumalanga. She played for the Imonti Penguins, Border Bulldogs and the South Africa women's national rugby union team as a Number 8.

== Career ==
Williams started playing rugby for Jogalanga Women, a club founded by her father, in 1999. When she was 16, she was invited to Border Bulldogs trials and was selected for the team to play in the women's Currie Cup. Shortly afterwards she made her international debut for South Africa in 2004. In 2006, she was awarded the South African Rugby Union's Women's player of the year award after playing in South Africa's first women's World Cup campaign at the 2006 Women's Rugby World Cup.

In 2012, Williams was named as captain of the South Africa women's national rugby sevens team for the inaugural IRB Women's Sevens Series. During the 2014 Women's Rugby World Cup, Williams served as captain however after South Africa's first match, she was banned for 16 weeks for eye-gouging and missed the rest of the tournament. She appealed against this but failed to overturn the ban. Williams retired from rugby in 2016.

== Personal life ==
Williams studied sports management at Walter Sisulu University. Following retirement, she became a sports commentator.
