= John Haimes =

Australian mail coach operator

John Haimes (c. 1826 – 26 May 1890) was pioneer mail coach operator, hotelier and brewer in South Australia, and pastoralist and racehorse breeder and owner in Victoria, Australia, where he was universally known as "Captain Haimes".

== History ==
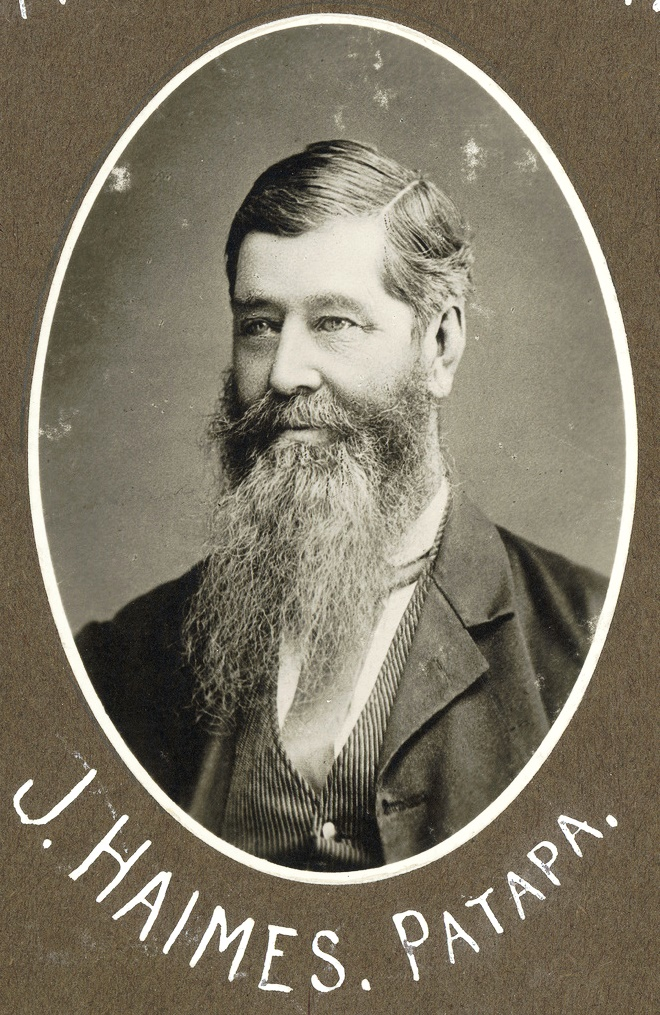
John Haimes, brewer, pastoralist and racehorse owner.

Haimes was born in Australia, perhaps in Sydney, a son of Richard Haimes ( – 31 March 1833), from 1832 licensee of the Waterloo Tavern, George Town, Tasmania. His father was killed at Sandy Bay when kicked by a horse, and his mother Margaret Haimes took over running the hotel. She married again, on 15 January 1835, to George Thomas Wilson; they ran the hotel until 1842. In 1847–1848 he had, with one Hardcastle, the licence for the hotel at Marrabool Creek (possibly present-day Moorabool), near Geelong.

Haimes moved to South Australia, and in 1851 took the licence for the Sir John Franklin hotel at North Kapunda.

Referring to the portrait photo caption: "Potapa, Patapa or as it is spelt today Puttapa, is in the northern Flinders Ranges and now forms part of the Beltana pastoral lease. It was taken up in 1854 by John Haimes at which time it was 195 square miles in extent. He sold it in 1862 to Thomas Elder. Haimes also held at various times the Baroota run and Old Telowie run (near Port Germein) in the mid north of South Australia."

He became involved in the mail contract business, in April 1855 taking over John Hayter's share of Simms & Hayter, operating out of Currie Street as Simms & Haimes (dissolved January 1856), then Haimes & Co running a weekly service to Moorundee. This was the time of the gold rush, and much traffic was carried on the River Murray from such river towns to the diggings of Victoria. He established a depot at Gawler 1857, then sold the business in September and January 1858. He had a separate carrying company Haimes & Jewell with Peter Jewell, which operated from January 1856 to May 1857. When Jewell faced insolvency Haimes purchased his farm Lots 101, 111 and part of 112, Netley, which in 1858 became his place of residence, left 1860, sold 1872. He also owned Lot 238 Unley (did this become Waverley Brewery?).

He bred horses at Tullowie in the 1850s in a partnership with Peter Jewell which ended in acrimony and a lawsuit. He was judge at the Kapunda races; starter at Gawler races in 1859 and several meetings at the Thebarton course in 1860.

He was appointed Captain in the South Australian Volunteer Military Force in March 1860, the source of his assumed title "Captain", which he affected in Victoria (but not South Australia).

He left for England in 1861 and returned to Australia 1864, largely sold up his Adelaide assets and settled in Colac, Victoria. He served several years as a councillor in the Colac council, and an alderman of Geelong.

He purchased Mamre estate of 2,342 acres (950 ha) near Colac, which he sold in 1873 (then leased?) and continued to breed horses and sheep; Wychetella estate of 6,912 acres (2,800 ha). Amongst the sires he owned were Rapidity, Coeur de Lion, and Bay Middleton, and Archie, Dufferin, Tasman, and Larpent were bred and raced by him. Several of his horses were successful at Flemington.

He was partner with Charles Mallen in founding the Waverley Brewery in 1878 and their company owned several public houses.

The very rich but somewhat eccentric Haimes died peacefully at Colac after several years of deteriorating health. Among his many bequests was £500 to each of the many children of his friend Edward Meade Bagot, comparable to a gift of $100,000 today.

== Family ==
Haimes never married. His brother Richard Haimes (c. 1826 – 25 July 1871) had a daughter, Susannah Bridget Haimes (c. 1863 – 20 August 1895)

No evidence has been found to link him with Thebarton hoteliers, the brothers William Haimes (c. 1843 – 10 April 1901) and Charles Haimes (c. 1845 – 16 October 1898)
