= Nasrapur =

Village in Maharashtra

- Village
- Interactive map of Nasrapur
- Coordinates: 18°14′56″N 73°52′43″E
- Country: India
- District: Pune
- Taluka: Bhor

Nasrapur is a village located 13 kilometres (8.1 mi) from Bhor Taluka in the Pune District of Maharashtra, India. It is located 36 kilometres (22 mi) south of Pune, the district headquarters, and 160 kilometres (99 mi) from the state capital, Mumbai. Major nearby cities are Sasvad, Pune, Wai, and Pimpri-Chinchwad. The most commonly spoken language in Nasrapur is Marathi. Bhor and Pune are connected to Nasrapur by roads.

== Schools ==
- Shree Shivaji Vidyalaya Nasrapur
- Vijay Mukund Athavle Madhyamik Vidyalay Nasarapur
- Z.P School Indiranagar, Nasarapur
- Amruta Vidyalaya

=== Engineering college ===
- Navsahyadri college of Engineering Kelwade

=== Colleges ===
- Shree Shivaji High-school Nasrapur

== Economy ==
The economy of the Nasrapur village revolves around agriculture, travel and tourism.

Teakwood Forest Resort and Camp Pune is an eco-friendly agro-tourism resort right next to Baneshwar Temple

== See also ==
- Baneshwar Temple
- Waterfall
- Teakwood Forest Resort and Camp
