= Eye-gouging (rugby union) =

Type of foul play in rugby union

Eye-gouging is a serious offence in rugby union where a player uses hands or fingers to inflict pain in an opponent's eyes. The game's laws refer to it as "contact with eyes or the eye area of an opponent" but such incidents are usually referred to as "eye-gouging" among players and in the media.

== Definition ==
The laws of rugby union, as written by World Rugby, define foul play as: "Anything a player does within the playing enclosure that is against the letter and spirit of the Laws of the Game. It includes obstruction, unfair play, repeated infringements, dangerous play and misconduct which is prejudicial to the Game". Specifically, they state that "A player must not do anything that is dangerous to the opponent".

WR Regulations provide for punishment for contact with eyes or the eye area of an opponent.

Although this is usually called "eye-gouging" by the media, fans and players, the term "gouging" is not used in World Rugby's laws or regulations, which do list degrees of gravity of the offence. World Rugby themselves have used the term in a 2009 statement, when the body was known as the International Rugby Board (IRB): "The IRB are firmly of the view there is no place in rugby for illegal or foul play and the act of eye-gouging is particularly heinous".

=== Scales of the offence ===
Following two separate high-profile test match incidents, involving Schalk Burger and Sergio Parisse, during the same week in June 2009, the IRB stated that it would review the sanction structure for this type of offence "in order to send out the strongest possible message that such acts will not be tolerated".

The regulations provide a scale of seriousness. As of the most recent revision to the regulations in 2016, separate scales are provided for "contact with the eyes" and "contact with the eye area", where the "eyes" are defined as all tissues within and covering the orbital cavity, including eyelids, and "eye area" covers areas outside the orbital cavity but in close proximity to the eye.

Contact with the eyes

- Lower end: up to 12-week ban.
- Mid range: up to 18-week ban.
- Top end: greater than 24-week ban.

Contact with the eye area

- Lower end: up to 4-week ban.
- Mid range: up to 8-week ban.
- Top end: greater than 12-week ban.

The maximum sanction for either is a 156-week (3 year) ban.

In sevens, bans are officially expressed in numbers of matches instead of weeks, reflecting the schedule of the Sevens World Series for men and women, as well as other major events for sevens teams.

== History ==
In the early days of rugby, eye gouging was commonplace and happened mainly in the scrum due to a lack of control by referees and the opportunity the scrum offered for players to commit foul play due to the way the scrum is formed. The rising amount of foul play involving eye gouging eventually lead to the founding of the Rugby Football Union to control rugby and to reduce the amount of foul play. Eye-gouging then began to disappear from the early game as the laws of rugby became stricter due to English public school students starting to play rugby. After then foul play including eye-gouging became largely unspoken of and rugby authorities often ignored complaints of eye-gouging. This was due to authorities expecting players to deal with it themselves as it was claimed to be part of the nature of the game and was often viewed as a joke. In 1992, Richard Loe made contact with Greg Cooper's eyes while playing in the National Provincial Championship and was banned for nine months after a nine-hour deliberation by the New Zealand Rugby Union's judicial committee. This was viewed by observers as a turning point in attitudes towards eye-gouging and punishments for eye-gouging became stricter. According to John Daniell, a New Zealand lock who played for nearly a decade in France, eye gouging is fairly common and considered "a way of life" in French rugby, where it is known as "la fourchette".

Sanctions for eye-gouging have been subject to debate by journalists and commentators, depending on interpretation by presiding disciplinary officers. Punishments in the Northern Hemisphere are seen by some journalists as being harsher than those for similar offenses seen in Southern Hemisphere countries. South African national coach, Peter de Villiers stated he did not believe that an eye-gouging incident for which Schalk Burger was yellow carded merited any punishment.

== Examples ==
Clarence Harding after a severe eye gouge

As well as many cases involving professional rugby union, the case of Clarence Harding, an amateur player, has received considerable coverage due to the extreme damage caused to his eye. Harding was left without sight in his right eye and can no longer play rugby, and the injury has affected his livelihood and has since had the eye removed due to the pain. Matt Iles, the player alleged to have injured Harding, was found not guilty by the RFU as they could not determine which player was responsible. However, Maidstone RFC were fined £2,000 and deducted 50 points after being found "guilty of conduct prejudicial to the interests of the game". The incident was also investigated by Kent Police but no criminal charges were brought against Maidstone or Iles due to insufficient evidence.

On 2 October 2010, Gavin Quinnell suffered an eye injury during a game between Llanelli and Cross Keys, from which he lost the sight in his left eye. The incident was under investigation by the Welsh Rugby Union and Gwent Police, with the police arresting the perpetrator. However, the Crown Prosecution Service advised against prosecution, leading to the dropping of criminal charges, and the WRU eventually dropped its citing complaint, to the self-described shock of the Quinnell family, one of the most prominent in Welsh rugby.

An incident in the Rugby World Cup final on 23 October 2011 led the IRB to reevaluate its disciplinary procedures. France centre Aurélien Rougerie apparently made contact with the eyes of New Zealand captain Richie McCaw, who would later state that he had been "half-blinded" for the last few minutes of the match. The original camera angles provided by host broadcaster Sky NZ showed no apparent foul play, and Rougerie was not cited within the 36-hour window allowed by IRB rules at the time. Three days after the match, new Sky NZ footage emerged which showed Rougerie apparently raking his hand across McCaw's eyes. The IRB could not cite Rougerie outside the 36-hour window, and the exception allowed in its rules for "exceptional circumstances" did not include the emergence of new evidence. In December 2011 the IRB announced that it would reconsider its procedures to address similar situations in the future.

=== High-profile cases ===
This is a list of cases where eye-gouging has been reported to have happened in top national league, European Cup or international level rugby union matches. It is shown in chronological order; international matches are highlighted. Players banned for contact with eyes or the eye area of an opponent as well as eye-gouging are included.

Offence date	Offender	Victim	Length of ban (weeks)	Playing	
Offence date	Offender	Victim	Length of ban (weeks)	For	Against
1992	(New Zealand) Richard Loe	(New Zealand) Greg Cooper	26	Waikato	Otago
1997	(New Zealand) Troy Flavell	(New Zealand) Steve Sinkinson	3	North Harbour	Wellington
1999-11-26	(France) Richard Nones	(Wales) Sven Cronk	104	Colomiers	Pontypridd
2003-08-02	(South Africa) Bakkies Botha	(Australia) Brendan Cannon	8	South Africa	Australia
2003-10-26	(Argentina) Roberto Grau	(Ireland) Keith Wood	9	Argentina	Ireland
2003-10-26	(Argentina) Mauricio Reggiardo	(Ireland) Reggie Corrigan	6	Argentina	Ireland
2007-01-20	(France) Daniel Larrechea	Not available	6	Sale Sharks	Ospreys
2007-04-20	(England) Dylan Hartley	(England) James Haskell and (Ireland) Johnny O'Connor	26	Northampton Saints	London Wasps
2008-02-23	(Italy) Mauro Bergamasco	(Wales) Lee Byrne	13	Italy	Wales
2008-03-15	(Fiji) Seru Rabeni	(England) Andi Kyriacou	14	Leicester Tigers	Saracens
2008-07-12	(South Africa) Bismarck du Plessis	(New Zealand) Adam Thomson	3	South Africa	New Zealand
2008-09-20	(Ireland) Neil Best	(England) James Haskell	18	Northampton Saints	London Wasps
2008-10-18	(Romania) Marius Țincu	(Wales) Paul James	18	Perpignan	Ospreys
2009-01-24	(England) Martin Corry	(Wales) Richard Hibbard	6	Leicester Tigers	Ospreys
2009-04-18	(France) Olivier Azam	(Wales) Jamie Roberts	9	Gloucester	Cardiff Blues
2009-05-02	(Ireland) Alan Quinlan	(Ireland) Leo Cullen	12	Munster	Leinster
2009-06-26	(Italy) Sergio Parisse	(New Zealand) Isaac Ross	8	Italy	New Zealand
2009-06-27	(South Africa) Schalk Burger	(Ireland) Luke Fitzgerald	8	South Africa	British and Irish Lions
2009-10-09	(Ireland) Shane Jennings	(England) Nick Kennedy	12	Leinster	London Irish
2009-12-12	(France) Julien Dupuy	(Ireland) Stephen Ferris	24	Stade Français	Ulster
2009-12-12	(France) David Attoub	(Ireland) Stephen Ferris	70	Stade Français	Ulster
2010-08-28	(Argentina) Juan Manuel Leguizamón	(France) Jean Bouilhou	12	Stade Français	Toulouse
2010-12-19	(Wales) Richie Rees	(England) Dylan Hartley	12	Cardiff Blues	Northampton Saints
2011-04-02	(England) Mark Cueto	(England) Christian Day	9^{a}	Sale Sharks	Northampton Saints
2011-10-02	(Italy) Leonardo Ghiraldini	(Ireland) Cian Healy	15	Italy	Ireland
2014-01-25	(New Zealand) Sam Dickson	(Fiji) Not available	8^{b}	New Zealand Sevens	Fiji Sevens
2014-08-01	(South Africa) Mandisa Williams	(Australia) Alisha Hewett	16	South Africa Women	Australia Women
2014-11-22	(Canada) Ray Barkwill	(Romania) Not available	9	Canada	Romania
2015-09-20	(Argentina) Mariano Galarza	(New Zealand) Brodie Retallick	9	Argentina	New Zealand
2016-01-09	(Fiji) Josaia Raisuqe	(South Africa) CJ Stander	15	Stade Français	Munster
2016-01-16	(England) Chris Ashton	(Ireland) Luke Marshall	10	Saracens	Ulster
2016-03-12	(Wales) Tomas Francis	(England) Dan Cole	8	Wales	England
2016-12-10	(South Africa) George Earle	(England) Tom Ellis	8	Cardiff Blues	Bath
2017-09-30	(England) Kyle Sinckler	(England) Michael Paterson	7	Harlequins	Northampton Saints
2017-10-14	(South Africa) Francois Louw	(Italy) Marco Fuser	3	Bath	Benetton Treviso
2017-10-14	(France) Terry Bouhraoua	(Russia) Valery Tsnobiladze	4	Stade Français	Krasny Yar
2025-04-05	(South Africa) Henco Venter	(England) Dan Cole	6	Glasgow Warriors	Leicester Tigers
2026-03-07	(France) Oscar Jegou	(Scotland) Ewan Ashman	4	France	Scotland

== See also ==
- Eye-gouging (Gaelic football)

== Notes ==
1. ^ Note a: Prior to the announcement of the RFU's nine-week ban on 11 April 2011, Cueto had received a six-week ban from his club. The bans ultimately ran concurrently.
2. ^ Note b: Dickson's ban was officially announced as nine matches; the NZRU chose not to appeal. This covered the final of the 2014 USA Sevens and the entirety of the 2014 Wellington Sevens; he will be available for the 2014 Japan Sevens.
