= Deutsche Schule, Adelaide =

A Deutsche Schule operated in Adelaide between 1851 and 1878, teaching, among other subjects, German to English-speaking students, and vice versa.

== History ==
The Schule had its origins in the "German and English School", founded by E. P. Nesbit (died 1900, the father of Paris Nesbit) and Hermann Carl von Schleinitz in November 1850 at the "German Castle" on East Terrace. The Schule was founded by Schleinitz in Freeman Street (now that part of Gawler Place between Grenfell and Wakefield streets) a few months later, and catered to boys and girls, both native English and German speakers, though predominately the latter. English classes were taken by Henry Nootnagel. Johann Christian Hansen took over the school in 1852 during what was meant to be Schleinitz's temporary absence, The Schule had moved to Flinders Street by July 1856, and was still in operation June 1857. In 1858 Hansen was running a school in Pirie Street, but it is not certain that this was the same school.

In 1859 Adolph Leschen (died 1916) and Theodor Niehuus (died 1912) reopened the Deutsche Schule in Wakefield Street near the "Scotch Church" (St Andrew's, later Willard Hall at nos.35–45). The school licence (on which depended a government subsidy) was transferred from that of Hansen. Niehuus had been second master at W. A. Cawthorne's school on Victoria Square. and Leschen instructed in gymnastics at the Flinders Street gymnasium, a passion he brought to the Schule. A feature of the (now boys only) school under their management was an annual march, accompanied by banners and Heinrich Schrader's brass band, to the Maid and Magpie Hotel, where students competed in a crossbow shooting contest, the target being the effigy of an eagle, perched on a tall pole, the champion archer being then crowned "king" and ceremonially escorted home. This festival became a popular entertainment, particularly among the German community, with casual onlookers outnumbering parents and friends of the students. In 1869 a new building was erected for the Schule in Wakefield Street, east of Pulteney Street (so on the north side, the southern extension of Pulteney street then being designated Hanson Street).

Leschen was not associated with the Schule after 1870, and in 1871 founded the "Adelaide German–English Educational Institution" on Pulteney Street. He had been conducting a gymnastics class at the Adelaider Turnverein under the auspices of the German Club since November 1864, and classes for ladies. By 1874, following the opening of model schools, attendance at the Schule had started to decline, so Niehuus moved to smaller premises on Grenfell Street opposite the Sturt Hotel. In 1877 the Council of Education decided funding of the Schule should be extended for another year despite the recent opening of the East Adelaide school, on the grounds that it was the only suitable institution for students who spoke only German. The landlord however had other plans for their building, and Niehuus found other premises in Twin Street, off Rundle Street for the coming year. The Schule did not reopen in 1879.

In 1880 Niehuus was appointed head teacher of the Hoyleton school, whose previous masters were Charles Otto and J. Friedrich Schüttlöffel.
