= William Oswald Whitridge =

Australian cricket umpire (1853–1919)

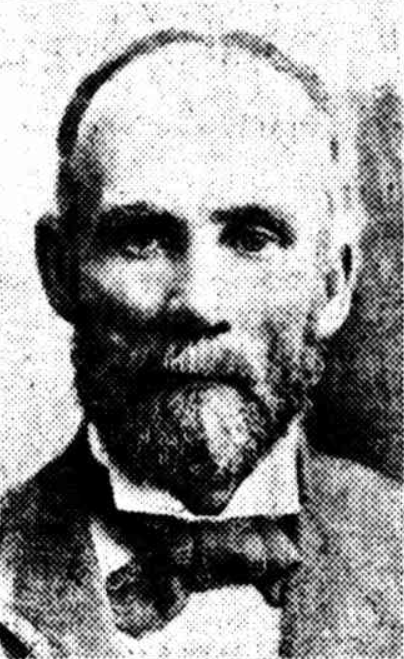
W. O. Whitridge

William Oswald Whitridge (14 August 1853 – 12 February 1919) was an Australian Test cricket umpire. Whitridge was also an administrator with the South Australian Cricket Association (SACA).

== Biography ==
Whitridge was born on 14 August 1853 in Kensington, South Australia, the elder son of W. W. R. Whitridge (ca.1824–1861) and his wife Charlotte Elizabeth (ca.1821–1910). He was educated at Adelaide Educational Institution, where he was a keen cricketer, playing with distinction against rival school St Peter's College. Whitridge was on the staff of the South Australian Register for 42 years, much of this time as head of the publishing department. His father and younger brother Fletcher were also with the Register.

Whitridge joined a cricket team that had claimed a part of Victoria Square for a practice pitch. When the Government set aside a portion of the parklands for a cricket ground, he was, at age 18, a major impetus behind formation of an association in May 1871 to organise district and interstate matches. He was known as a fine bowler: in the seasons 1877–78 and 1878–79 he had bowling averages of 5.24 and 4.09 respectively. In one match against Victoria he took 8 wickets for 10 runs, though there were occasional rumblings about his action verging on a "throw". He represented South Australia on the Australian Cricket Board in the 1890s along with John Creswell and Mostyn Evan.

He umpired one Test match between Australia and England in Adelaide on 24 March to 28 March 1892, standing with George Downs, who was also umpiring his only Test. England won easily by an innings and 230 runs – the largest Test victory margin to that date.

== Family ==
He married Marie Eleanora Korber (ca.1858 – 26 September 1924) on 20 October 1880; they had two daughters and three sons. He died on 12 February 1919 at his home, "Ringmer", in Wyatt Road, Burnside, previously the home of explorer Edwin S. Berry.

== See also ==
- List of Test cricket umpires
