= Templemichael, County Longford =

Civil parish in County Longford, Ireland

Coordinates: 53.732°N 7.783°W

Templemichael (Irish: Teampall Mhichíl) is a civil parish in County Longford, Ireland. It is approximately 40 square kilometres (15 sq mi) in area. Templemichael is also a Church of Ireland parish in the Diocese of Kilmore, Elphin and Ardagh. Churches within this Anglican parish include Saint John's Church (Templemichael) in Longford town.

There are 49 townlands in Templemichael, many of which are within Longford town, including Abbeycartron, Cloonbalt, Deanscurragh and Townparks.
