= John Berjew =

John Berjew (1815 – 19 March 1894) founded schools in North Adelaide, South Australia and Stanley, Tasmania.

== History ==
John Berjew and his wife Catherine Berjew, née Fooks (23 June 1819 – 14 May 1904), emigrated from England aboard Waterloo, arriving in Adelaide in November 1840. Their first child, Jane, was born on board the ship.

Also aboard Waterloo were her widowed mother Jane Fooks née Berjew (yes!) (25 December 1777 – 15 April 1875), solicitor brother William Samuel Fooks (26 February 1809 – 31 October 1856 in Sandridge, Victoria) and chaplain brother Samuel Berjew Fooks, later Fookes, (27 August 1822 – 2 November 1892 in Sandy Bay, Tasmania)

In 1846, Mrs Berjew founded a Ladies' Seminary at their home on Kermode Street, North Adelaide. Later that same year John Berjew, who had teaching experience at Milborne Port in England, founded the North Adelaide Academy in Kermode Street, adjacent to the Church of Christ site. He had the assistance, briefly, of one Gompertz BA, a Cambridge graduate, of whom further trace has been found. In July 1849, as an outcome of a lawsuit brought on by one Highland, Berjew's furniture and effects were sold by auction. Berjew and his family departed for Melbourne, leaving his assistant C. W. May as head of the school. The school closed later that year and in 1850 May was appointed to St. Peter's College.

In Melbourne Berjew worked as a journalist with the Argus for seven years, and in April 1856 moved to the Circular Head region of Tasmania, living at Stanley, where he founded a school, which ran for 28 years. He supplemented his income with a variety of jobs, including secretary for the West Emu Bay Board of Works,

In 1884 they moved to Burnie. John John had a stroke in 1890 and was crippled by paralysis until he died on 19 March 1894. His body was interred at Wivenhoe General Cemetery, Burnie. Catherine died on 14 May 1904 at her daughter's residence, Wilson Street, Burnie, at age 84. Her body was also interred at Wivenhoe General Cemetery.

== Family ==
Charles Berjew (1768–1854), architect of Hermitage, Dorset, married Susan Hooke (1790 – 29 March 1871) on 11 September 1839. Among their children were:

- Susan Berjew (c. 1811 – 13 September 1888) married Maurice Edwards (c. 1812 – 19 June 1888), lived in Glenelg

- Eleanor Allambridge Edwards (c. 1855 – 21 April 1928)

- John Berjew (1815 – 19 March 1894) married Catherine Jane Iles (or Eyles) Fooks (23 June 1819 – 14 May 1904) on 11 September 1839

- Jane Catherine Robinson Berjew (5 August 1840 (at sea) – 8 August 1875) married James George King (c. 1835 – 9 February 1924) on 8 April 1863. He was born in Dunedin, near Launceston but lived at "Highfield", Stanley, Tasmania most of his life. He was youngest son of John King Esq.
- Eleanor Mary Susan Berjew (20 July 1844 – 26 February 1891) married Sydney Harnett Wragg ( – ) on 14 April 1879
- Louisa Ann Garlick Berjew (7 June 1849 – 4 August 1927) married Joseph Birmingham "George" Alford (c. 1844 – 1 October 1907) on 21 June 1873
- Catherine Joan Fooks "Kate" Berjew (8 July 1851 – 26 April 1941) married Alfred Stutterd (c. 1833 – 5 January 1910) on 4 October 1876

- Mary Berjew (c. 1820 – 21 September 1914) married Thomas Garlick ( – 22 December 1897) on 26 September 1857, lived in Victoria. He was brother of architect Daniel Garlick.
- Samuel Allambridge Berjew (1826 – 9 June 1891)
