= John Martin (headmaster) =

Australian educator (1814–1876)

John Martin (1814 – 9 July 1876) was a schoolmaster in Adelaide, South Australia.

== History ==
John Martin was born in Stithians, Cornwall, where he was baptized on 29 July 1814 and taught in the village school. He arrived in South Australia on 21 November 1849, and settled at Tungkillo, where he served as a catechist and school master.

John Martin founded the Angas Street Academy in Adelaide in 1852. By the end of that year the school was conducted in Pirie Street, where it continued to at least 1856. By June 1857 it was in Freeman Street. In 1858 it moved to the premises of the Pulteney Street School (precursor of Pulteney Grammar School), which John Martin leased for three years. In 1858 he was chairman of the South Australian Preceptors' Association. In 1859 Martin named his school the Fellenberg Commercial School, after the Swiss Educationalist Philipp Emanuel von Fellenberg (1771-1844). It moved finally to Hindmarsh Square in July 1861.

He was universally regarded as an excellent teacher and a stern disciplinarian, but his use of the cane seems excessive, even for those days:

"I remember that school well," said Mr. Wright, and he smiled ruefully. "The master believed that the cane should play a big part in the education of the child, and he was a perfect artist in applying it. He reduced flogging to a science, and I believe he really experienced a savage joy in whacking his pupils. I remember we used to play marbles in front of the Pirie-street Church during the dinner hour . . . woe betide anyone who fired a marble after the bell went or who failed to grab his marbles and run for the school. He was marked for a caning, and when he came in all whom he had picked out would be ranged round the desk in a semi-circle, while he got down his weapon of torture, and went round and round that semi-circle until he was utterly exhausted. It was positively cruel the way he punished some of the boys. I remember one of the boys had a stubborn temper and would not cry, and he made him place his hand on the desk and slammed away at it until he cut it to pieces. There was trouble over that, but I forget what the result was. Those of us who did not give satisfaction in our lessons during the day were marched down to his house — a two-storey house, that is still standing, just before you come to the Brecknock Hotel. I remember one day we were marching down there, and old Martin was stumping along behind us. He had a cork leg. We had just turned round the Supreme Court corner, and he was a few yards behind, when we made a dash for it and disappeared. It was worth anything to see his face when he came round the corner and there was not a boy in sight. But we suffered for it next day. Notwithstanding the fearful punishment we received then, however, we did it again another night. He marched down to his place and put us in a shed in the yard, telling us to stay there until he had had his dinner, when he would come out and hear our lessons. But we cleared over the back wall. We caught it next day, I can tell you. Those were the times in which we went to school, and I am glad it has all changed now."

In 1864 the formation of the "Australian Patent Blasting Compound Company" to manufacture a novel blasting compound that had been developed in the USA was announced. One of the three Australian patent holders was John Martin's brother Thomas Martin (1825-1900), owner of the Willunga slate quarries. John Martin was appointed as manager of the Company. He left the Fellenberg School at the end of 1864 and moved to Melbourne, where the blasting compound was to be manufactured. A patent for "improved Compositions for Explosive purposes" was applied for in Victoria in October 1865. He may have been living in South Yarra when the company was awarded £25 premium for initiating a new industry to the colony. As a director of the company, Thomas Martin chaired a meeting of shareholders in Melbourne in January 1866. After June 1867, no more was heard of the company or the product.

Martin then moved to Ballarat East, where he opened a 'commercial academy'. He was still there in June 1871, when he was granted administration of his cousin William Martin's estate. He later settled with his family in Pentland Hills, Victoria, near Myrniong, where he taught at the local school. He died in Melbourne after a few weeks' illness. His remains were buried in the Melbourne General Cemetery.

His successor at the Fellenberg School in 1865 was James Morecott Holder ( – 1 November 1887). The school closed in 1866.

== Family ==
John Martin was the eldest son of Thomas Martin (1781-1848) and Elizabeth Martin (née Pearce) (1794-1864). His mother and seven of his siblings, including Thomas Martin (1825-1900 — see above), emigrated to South Australia between 1847 and 1851. The W. Martin who was present at tests of the blasting compound in Glen Osmond, Adelaide, in 1864 was probably his youngest brother, William.

In November 1850 John Martin married Ann Mills (1818-1896). They had seven children, of whom two died in infancy and a third aged 21.

As a member of the Martin family of Stithians, Cornwall, John Martin had no known family connection with Annie Montgomerie Martin (born in Birmingham, England), who ran Miss Martin's School on Flinders Street, Adelaide from 1870 to 1874, or with Allen Martin (born in Sussex, England), who had a school at Port Adelaide.

== Notable students ==
- A. M. Simpson
