= William Finlayson (churchman) =

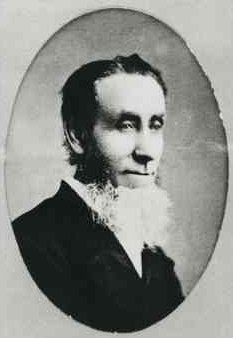
William Finlayson ca. 1875

William Finlayson (1813 – 18 December 1897) was a churchman and farmer in the early days of South Australia, and father of nine children including two sons prominent in the early days of that colony.

== Life ==
Born in Glasgow, he and his wife, née Helen Harvey (born Edinburgh 1811 – 20 October 1884), arrived at Holdfast Bay on the John Renwick around 7 February 1837, just seven weeks after Governor Hindmarsh. as missionaries with the Baptist Missionary Society of England.

Somehow his missionary ambitions failed to materialise. He found employment with the South Australian Company, keeping sheep at Brown Hill Creek with Samuel Sleep. He leased a nearby property of 164 acres from the South Australian Company, which he farmed while living in a cottage in Adelaide. By 1853 he had built a substantial residence "Helenholm" (frequently "Helenholme"), named for his wife, and in 1855 converted his land title to freehold.

He was a member of Robert Cock's 1837 exploration party that climbed Mount Barker and reached Lake Alexandrina. They were fearful of encountering the warlike Peramangk and Kaurna inhabitants, but never saw one, though no doubt their progress was being closely observed.

Adelaide's first Strict Baptist church meeting was held in July or September 1838 at his cottage in Rundle Street (later the site of Charles Birks' shop) with David McLaren acting as pastor.

He was one of the founding members of the first Congregational Church under the leadership of T. Q. Stow, then from 27 September 1857 acted as pastor (initially co-pastor) of Zion Chapel in Hanson Street (later renamed as part of Pulteney Street), a position he held for 40 years. Jacob Abbott was co-pastor for some years before moving to the new church at Stepney 1860 to 1877.

He was, with Thomas Playford (1795–1873) and Thomas Mugg (1794–1880), a founding trustee of the Mitcham General Cemetery.

In October 1895, he donated around 2 acres of land at Mitcham for the benefit of the destitute elderly, on which the 'Andrews Homes' were built, using money left by Mrs E. W. Andrews of Glenelg.

== Family ==
William Finlayson married Helen Harvey (born Edinburgh 1811 – 20 October 1884) before leaving for Australia. They had nine children:

- Jane Connell Finlayson, (c. 1837 – 9 July 1926) never married. Reputedly the first (white) girl born in the colony of South Australia on 19 September 1837. Another source has her born in Glasgow.
- Robert Kettle Finlayson (27 April 1839 – 27 March 1917)
- William Finlayson jun. (18 May 1841 – 20 August 1925) was educated at Adelaide Educational Institution, but did not figure prominently in the prize lists. He was employed at D. & J. Fowler's grocery warehouse and with fellow-employee George Brookman took over their retail outlet at 70 King William Street when the company went strictly wholesale around 1870. He sold that business to Crawford & Co. around 1890 to concentrate on his mining interests.

He married Sarah Anne Richardson (c. 1842 – 8 February 1875) in 1862; they had two daughters:
- Helen Mary Finlayson (1865–1915)
- Emily Laura "Emmie" Finlayson (1867–1956) married William Cormack Calder (c. 1870 – 2 November 1923) on 29 March 1898. Calder was with The Register then Hansard staff.
He married Emily Hambly Nickels (– 1917) on 10 December 1879. by whom he had two sons:
- Frederick William Finlayson (1881–) married cousin Dorothy Jean Finlayson (1893 –) on 12 August 1914. Dorothy was a daughter of Ebenezer Finlayson (see below).
- Ronald Nickels Finlayson (1882 – 1 December 1945)
According to one report, his widow married William Burford and nursed him in his last years. Burford died in 1925. If true, this could only mean that Finlayson married a third time.

- John Harvey Finlayson (3 February 1843 – 30 March 1915)
- Helen Harvey Finlayson (11 September 1846 – 8 June 1890) married William Ambrose of Mannum William Ambrose died on 22 February 1882. Their children were then brought up by grandfather Finlayson and two maiden aunts.

- Lily Finlayson Ambrose (1873 – 1966) became a medical doctor
- Ethel Mary Murray Ambrose (23 September 1874 – 17 February 1934) became a medical doctor and missionary to India
- Helen Harvey Ambrose (1876 – 14 December 1950)
- William Searle Ambrose (1878 – 1962)
- Theodore Finlayson Ambrose (1880 – 7 October 1947) became medical doctor in Perth.

- Ebenezer Finlayson (25 October 1848 – 2 October 1913) was also educated at Adelaide Educational Institution. He served as navigator on the River Murray with Captain Randell, then in business in partnerships Finlayson & Parsons and Finlayson & Gollin. He married Finnette Champion on 17 June 1885. Their children included:

- Ethel Mona Finlayson (26 May 1890 – 6 February 1977) Gordon Patterson Blackmore on 5 March 1913. Gordon was a grandson of Archdeacon Farr
- Dorothy Jean Finlayson (1892 –) married cousin Frederick William Finlayson (1881–) on 12 August 1914 (see above).

- Jessie Grace Finlayson (26 Sep 1850 – 3 August 1931) never married.
- Elizabeth Mary Christina "Bessie" Finlayson (26 August 1852 – 9 December 1946) m. Herbert Nickels of Forreston 27 September 1876
- Hannah Finlayson (8 Jul 1854 – 2 September 1928) m. Capt. William Beavis Randell (1856–1917) of Gumeracha

=== R. K. Finlayson ===
Eldest son Robert Kettle Finlayson (27 April 1839 – 27 March 1917) was born in North Adelaide and spent his younger days on their farm in Mitcham.

He was educated at J. L. Young's Adelaide Educational Institution and even while young was a keen churchgoer. He ran a Sunday-school in George Street, Stepney for the Rev. Allan W. Webb which became one of the most popular in Adelaide. He was appointed deacon of the Zion Chapel in Pulteney Street, Adelaide and in 1871 was appointed co-pastor, serving the churches in Pulteney Street, George Street and another at Burnside. He followed his father as pastor of Zion Church in December 1897. (Attendance at the Zion chapel later fell away and was used by Plymouth Brethren then the Salvation Army, where it served as a soup kitchen during the Great Depression).

He was secretary of the Adelaide City Mission for more than 25 years.

He was a regular and prominent participant in YMCA midday prayer meetings for 35 years.

He married Elizabeth Cornish (1842–1880) c. 1862 and moved to the city in 1877. They had eight children, including:

- Frank Arthur Finlayson (1864 – 11 October 1895), a talented cricketer, was involved in a tragic cricketing accident in 1885 at the Adelaide Oval which resulted in the death of another player, Ernest A. Stow, a son of Judge Stow and grandson of T. Q. Stow.
- Albert Clement Finlayson (1876–1920) married C(aroline) Ethel Fitch (1879–1958) on 25 April 1907. She was a daughter of J. T. Fitch. A. C. Finlayson was a prominent member of the South Australian Literary Societies' Union.

He married again in 1884, to the widow Elizabeth "Edith" Bowen, née Burford (c. 1832 – 28 January 1900), eldest daughter of W. H. Burford). He died at "Helenholm" after several months' severe illness, and was buried at the Mitcham cemetery.

=== J. Harvey Finlayson ===
John Harvey Finlayson (3 February 1843 – 30 March 1915), editor and part-owner of the South Australian Register, was born at "Helenholm". He was educated at George Mugg's school and Adelaide Educational Institution.

Finlayson joined The Register in 1861 and became head reporter 1866, a proprietor in 1877 and editor in 1878. He resigned in 1899 due to ill-health and went to England. There he was appointed resident reporter until retiring and returning to Adelaide in 1908, dying seven years later. As an editor he was an outspoken supporter of female suffrage, free secular education, free trade between the Colonies, and Federation. He was an active Congregational churchman, and was appointed Justice of the Peace in 1880.

He married Alice Shoobridge (c. 1847 – 6 June 1933) on 20 March 1878. They had a son Harvey Pym Finlayson, and a daughter Katharine, ("Kate").

== Bibliography ==
- Reminiscences by William Finlayson Proceedings of the Royal Geographical Society of Australasia: South Australian Branch, 1902. (Manuscript annotated by Thomas Allen, Thesis (B.A. (Hons)), Flinders University, Dept of English, 2003)
