= Trowbridge Island =

Coordinates: 62°0′S 57°39′W

Trowbridge Island is an island lying 2 nautical miles (3.7 km) northwest of Cape Melville in Destruction Bay, off the east coast of King George Island in the South Shetland Islands. Named by the United Kingdom Antarctic Place-Names Committee (UK-APC) in 1960 for the sealer Lady Trowbridge (Captain Richard Sherratt) from Liverpool, which was wrecked off Cape Melville on 25 December 1820.

== See also ==
- List of antarctic and sub-antarctic islands
