= Carl Albert Unbehaun =

Australian electrical engineer

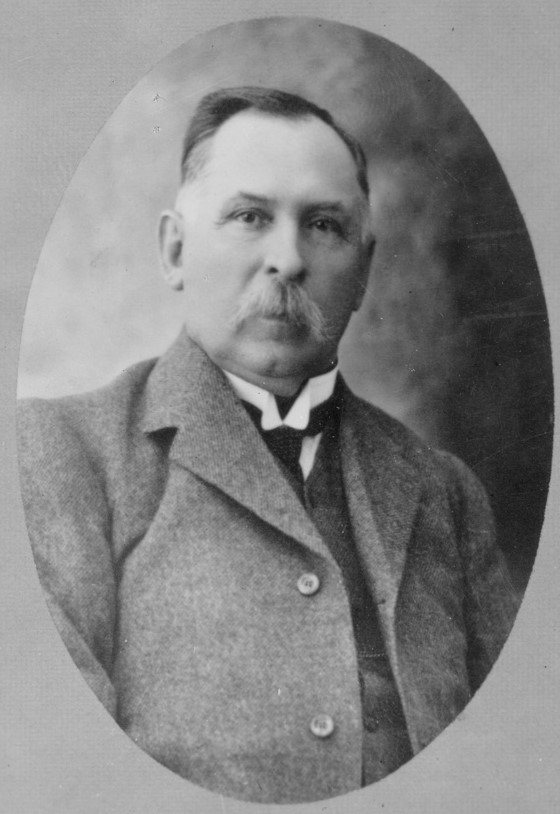

Carl Albert Unbehaun (1851 – 5 February 1924) was an electrical engineer in South Australia.

== History ==
Carl was born in Rudolstadt, Germany, where he was apprenticed as a sewing machine mechanic, and when he was 14 years old he ran away to New York, where he found employment with the Singer Sewing Machine Company, and travelled over much of the United States on their behalf. He met Alexander Graham Bell, the inventor of the telephone, and became deeply interested in the invention. The Franco-Prussian War had just begun and Carl Albert Unbehaun, with every other young German man, was called to enlist, which as someone opposed to all war, held no attractions and he notified the German authorities of his refusal to return to the Fatherland. For this, all his legal and civil rights were forfeit, and he worked his passage to Sydney, where his knowledge of the telephone system made him a useful employee. He entered the New South Wales Telegraph Department as instrument fitter to assist in the equipment of the operating room in the Sydney Post-Office, which was under construction.

In 1876 he was head-hunted by Charles Todd for the position of electrical fitter in charge of the Postal Telegraph workshop in Adelaide, and Unbehaun left New South Wales for South Australia in 1877. He built and installed the instruments for the first telephonic communication in South Australia, conducted for the Post-office Department on Christmas Day, 1877. On 14 May 1883 Adelaide's first telephone exchange, with 48 subscribers, was officially established in a corner of the telegraph operating-room of the General Post Office, Adelaide. In 1884 he took charge of the Electrical Department. He became Inspector of Telephones, later styled "Electrical Engineer and Inspector of Telephones" in 1891. He was in charge of installation of electric lighting in Parliament House, North Terrace. With Federation and the unification of Telegraph departments in 1904, he was given the title of Electrical Engineer.

He supervised the laying of the submarine cables from Edithburgh to Trowbridge Island in 1881 and from the Althorpes to Cape Spencer in 1886.

He was recommended by Todd for the position of electrician with the Post Office in Perth, which he held for two years. He then joined the South Australian Railways Department on 1 July 1885, as superintendent of its electrical department, where he remained for 30 years, retiring in 1924.

In 1898 Unbehaun and Edward Astley Johnstone (died 1954) founded Unbehaun and Johnstone, electrical engineers of Grenfell Street, later radio manufacturers and retailers of 54–58 North Terrace, Adelaide, then 55 Gawler Place, Adelaide. One of their first contracts was to install electric lighting in the Government freezing works at Port Adelaide.

== Other interests ==
He became a member of the Royal Society of Adelaide in 1879. He helped found the SA Electrical Society in 1887, and was a founding member of the South Australian Institute of Engineers and the Institution of Engineers.

He also played a prominent part in the wireless experiments carried out by Sir Charles Todd and Professor Bragg between Adelaide and Henley Beach in 1887. He was much sought after as a lecturer on the subject, and was generous with his time and expertise.. He later operated amateur radio station 5AX.

Unbehaun was a well-known Freemason, and was a prominent member of the Adelaide Photographic Society.

== Family ==
He was twice married; they lived at Halifax-street, Adelaide. There were no children of the second marriage. In addition to his widow, the following members of his family survive: Albert (Perth), Gus (Melbourne), Charles Unbehaun (Singapore), and Miss Lena Unbehaun (Perth).
