= Gouget noir =

Variety of grape

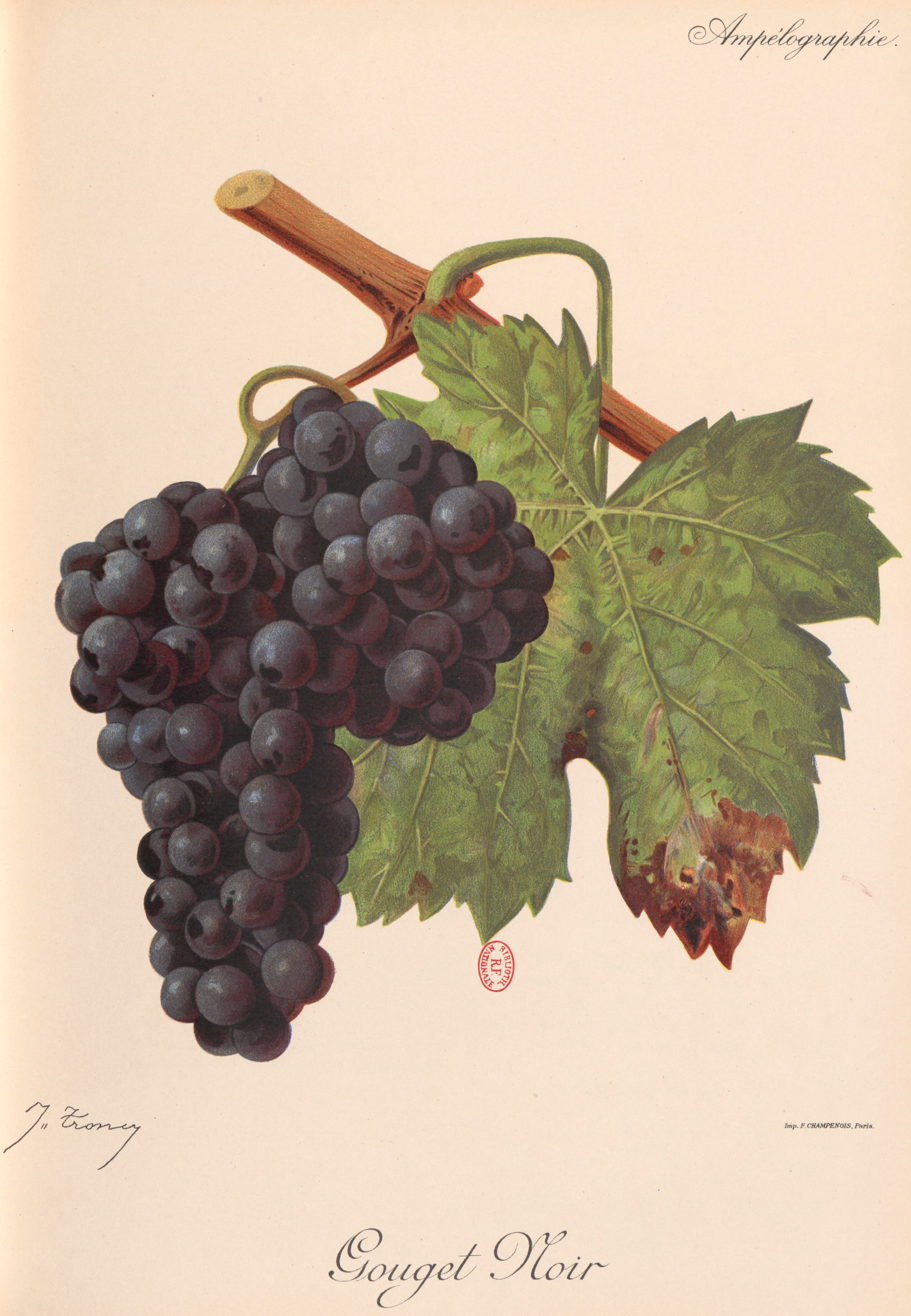
Gouget noir.

Gouget noir is a red French wine grape variety that is grown in the Allier and Cher departments of central France. The grape was once widely planted with almost 17,000 hectares (42,008 acres) in the mid-19th century but the phylloxera epidemic greatly diminished it numbers and as of 2008 there was just 10 hectares (25 acres) of the grape planted in France.

== History ==
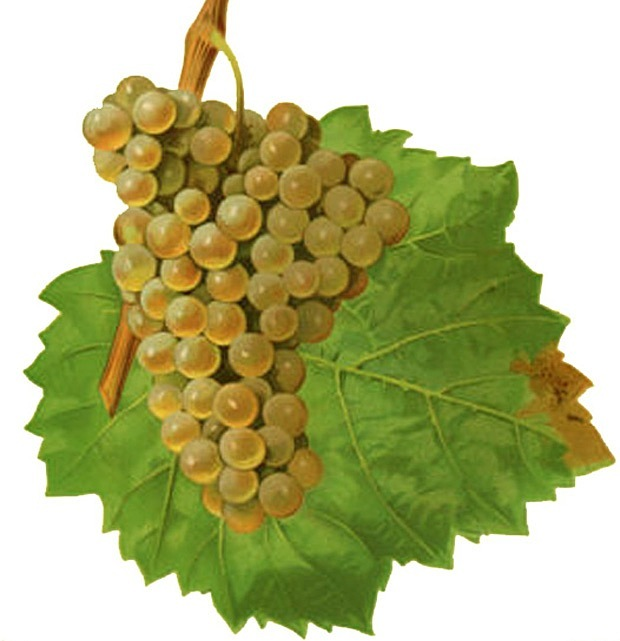
Gouget noir may be an offspring of Gouais blanc (pictured) which is also known under the synonym Gouget blanc.

The origins of the name Gouget noir is not known. Some wine experts, such as Master of Wine Jancis Robinson, speculate that it may have been named after a vineyard owner and propagator of vine cuttings since Gouget is a common family name. DNA analysis suggests that the grape may be descended from the Hunnic grape Gouais blanc that is known under the synonym Gouget blanc and has sired many French wine grapes such as Chardonnay, Gamay noir, Aubin vert, Balzac blanc and Bachet noir.

The grape's history in central France dates back at least to the 19th century where an 1843 document showed that it was used as both a wine and table grape in the Allier and Cher department where it was prized for the sweet flavor of its flesh. Gouget noir became a specialty of the communes of Domérat, Huriel and Montluçon and by the mid-19th century the grape accounted for nearly half of all vineyard plantings in Allier with almost 17,000 hectares (42,008 acres). As with nearly all French wine regions, viticulture in Allier sharply declined after the phylloxera epidemic of the late-19th century but as winemaking returned most of the vineyards in Allier replanted with different varieties such as Gamay noir.

== Viticulture ==
The Allier department of central France where Gouget noir is still being grown today.

Gouget noir is an early ripening variety that tends to produce small clusters of tiny berries. The vine also tends to bud early but is fairly resistant to springtime frost damage with its most significant viticultural hazard being its susceptibility to botrytis bunch rot.

The grape is often confused for being clones of Gamay noir and Pinot noir and while there might be a relationship to Gamay via a shared parentage with Gouais blanc, DNA analysis has confirmed that Gouget noir is its own distinct variety.

== Wine regions ==
Today, Gouget noir is still found in the Allier and Cher regions but its numbers are far fewer from its pre-phylloxera plantings or even the 739 ha (1,826 acres) that were growing after World War II. The 2008 census of wine grape varieties counted only 10 ha (25 acres) of the grape, mostly found in the commune of Huriel in the Allier department.

== Synonyms ==
Over the years Gouget noir has been known under a variety of synonyms including: Gauget noir, Gouge, Gouge noir, Goujet, Lyonnais, Moret, Nérou, Neyrac, Neyran, Neyrou and Petit Neyran.
