= Eye-gouging =

Act of pressing or tearing the eye

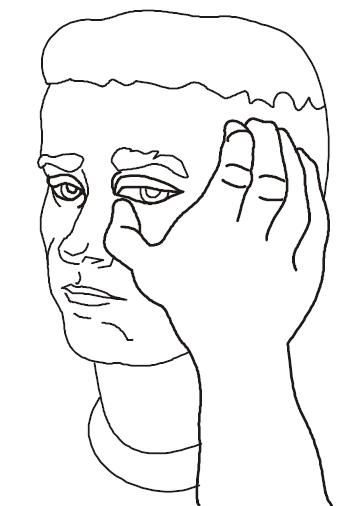
Eye-gouging using the thumb

Eye-gouging is the act of pressing or tearing the eye using the fingers or instruments. Eye-gouging involves a very high risk of eye injury, such as eye loss or blindness.

Eye-gouging as a fighting style was once a popular form of sport fighting in the back-country United States, primarily in the 18th and 19th centuries.

Eye-gouging is prohibited in modern sports. It is a serious offense in rugby football codes where it occurs rarely. It is prohibited in combat sports, but some self-defense systems teach it. Training in eye-gouging can involve extensive grappling training to establish control, the eye-gouging itself being practiced with the opponent wearing eye protection such as swimming goggles. Yuki Nakai went on to win a bout in the Vale Tudo Japan 1995 tournament after his opponent, Gerard Gordeau, performed an illegal gouge that blinded him in his right eye.

== See also ==
- Enucleation of the eye
- Eye for an eye
- Eye poke
- List of rugby union players banned for eye gouging
- Gouging (fighting style)
- Phantom eye syndrome
