= W. W. R. Whitridge =

Australian newspaper editor

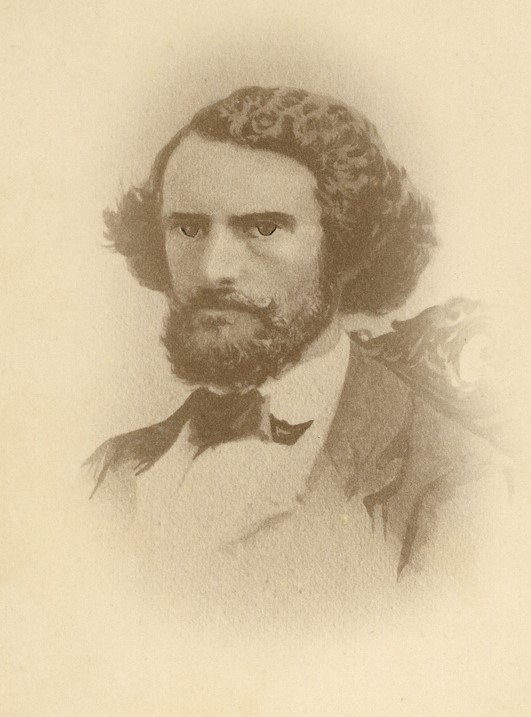

William Whitridge Roberts Whitridge (c. 1824 – 26 May 1861) was an Australian newspaper editor in the early days of South Australia.

== History ==
Whitridge emigrated from England on the Panama, arriving in South Australia in October 1850. A fellow passenger, with whom he was to found a lasting friendship, was John Lorenzo Young, founder in 1852 of the Adelaide Educational Institution.

Whitridge worked for the Austral Examiner before taking a job as editor with the South Australian Register around 1859. He was a member of the Free Rifles corps and a foundation member of the Philosophical Society and the South Australian Society of Arts. He was married and had a home "Kurltoparinga", Inman Valley (which served as the local church), then "Pine Villa", Enfield, where he died suddenly, aged 36.

He had created a sufficient impression among art and literature lovers of Adelaide that a well-attended lecture was given in White's Assembly Rooms by W. Townsend for the benefit of his widow and family.

== Family ==
He was married to Charlotte Elizabeth (c. 1821 – 7 March 1910); they had five children:

- William Oswald Whitridge (14 August 1853 – 14 February 1919) married Marie Eleanora Korber (c. 1858 – 26 September 1924) on 20 October 1880. Educated at AEI, he was a noted cricketer.
- Elizabeth Ada Whitridge (31 May 1855 – 10 March 1937) married George Jacob Trevelion (c. 1854 – 12 August 1914) on 25 April 1877
- Edith Mary Whitridge (15 September 1856 – 9 September 1948) married Frederick Arthur Bowen (c. 1857 – 28 May 1938) on 26 January 1882.
- Kate Askew Whitridge (17 November 1859 – 29 December 1945) married Henry Alfred Gooden (died 30 March 1904) on 21 November 1882
- Charles Fletcher Whitridge (24 April 1861 – 24 April 1906) secretary of the China Inland Mission.
