= Rough and tumble fighting =

18th-19th century American rural fighting style

- Also known as: Gouging
- Focus: Self-defense
- Country of origin: United States
- Creator: Various
- Parenthood: European and North American martial arts
- Olympic sport: No

Rough-and-tumble fighting was a form of fighting in rural portions of the United States, primarily in the 18th and 19th centuries. It was often characterized by the objective of gouging, but also included other brutally disfiguring techniques, including biting, and typically took place in order to settle disputes.

== Popularity ==
Though gouging was common by the 1730s in southern colonies, the practice was waning by the 1840s, by which time the Bowie knife and revolver had made frontier disputes more lethal. Though it was never an organized sport, participants would sometimes schedule their fights (as one could schedule a duel), and victors were treated as local heroes. Gouging was essentially a type of duel to defend one's honor that was most common among the poor, and was especially common in southern states in the late eighteenth and early nineteenth centuries.

== Practice ==
When a dispute arose, fighters could either agree to fight "fair", meaning according to Broughton rules, or "rough and tumble". According to Elliott Gorn:

Around the beginning of the nineteenth century, men sought original labels for their brutal style of fighting. "Rough-and-tumble" or simply "gouging" gradually replaced "boxing" as the name for these contests.

— Gorn (1985)

Ears, noses, lips, fingers and genitals could be disfigured in these fights, but Gorn notes:

The emphasis on maximum disfigurement, on severing bodily parts, made this fighting style unique. Amid the general mayhem, however, gouging out an opponent's eye became the sine qua non of rough-and-tumble fighting, much like the knockout punch in modern boxing. The best gougers, of course, were adept at other fighting skills. Some allegedly filed their teeth to bite off an enemy's appendages more efficiently. Still, liberating an eyeball quickly became a fighter's surest route to victory and his most prestigious accomplishment.

— Gorn (1985)

The practice spread at least as far west as rural Missouri, where "a particularly dextrous fellow could pluck his opponent's eyeballs from their sockets with one good thrust of the thumbs." This disfigurement may have been subsequently construed as a visible sign of dishonor. Though the practice was widespread, it was "best suited to the backwoods", according to Gorn.

As the new style of fighting evolved, its geographical distribution changed. Leadership quickly passed from the southern seaboard to upcountry counties and the western frontier ... the settlers of western Carolina, Kentucky, and Tennessee, as well as upland Mississippi, Alabama, and Georgia, became especially known for their pugnacity.

— Gorn (1985)

Though legend sometimes amplifies the brutality of these fights, Gorn emphasizes the historical reality of these events:

Foreign travelers might exaggerate and backwoods storytellers embellish, but the most neglected fact about eye-gouging matches is their actuality.

— Gorn (1985)

== Legislation ==
An act passed by the Virginia Assembly in 1752 begins by remarking that "many mischievous and ill disposed persons have of late, in a malicious and barbarous manner, maimed, wounded, and defaced, many of his majesty's subjects", then very specifically makes it a felony to "put out an eye, slit the nose, bite or cut off a nose, or lip", among other offenses. The Assembly went on to amend the act in 1772 to make it clear that this included "gouging, plucking or putting out an eye." Court cases and legal rulings in Tennessee, South Carolina, and Arkansas provide ample evidence of the history of this type of fighting.

== See also ==
- Mutual combat
- Duel
- Street fighting
- Bare-knuckle boxing
- Vale Tudo
