= John Lorenzo Young =

English-Australian educationalist

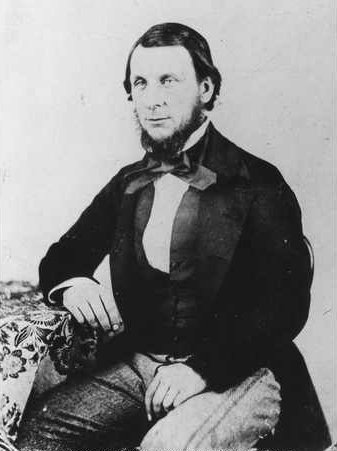
John Lorenzo Young ca. 1861 In 1852 founded the Adelaide Educational Institution, for a time the largest private independent school in South Australia. In 1872 new premises were built at Parkside in Young Street (named after the schoolmaster). For a photograph of the school, see B 1843.

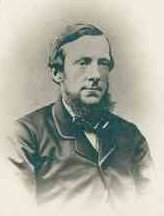
Oliver Young, brother to John Lorenzo, photographed ca. 1870

John Lorenzo Young (30 May 1826 in London – 26 July 1881 at sea) was an English-Australian educationalist and founder of the Adelaide Educational Institution.

== Early life ==
Young was born in London, a son of John Tonkin Young (1802 – 10 April 1882), a builder from Veryan, Cornwall.

He was educated at the Communal College of Boulogne, under Professor Opel at Wiesbaden, in 1842 at the College for Civil Engineers in Putney, and at King's College London from 1843 to 1845, where John Howard Clark, editor of The Register, was a fellow student. Another reference says this fellow-student was Clark's brother A. Sidney Clark.

== Career ==
He worked in Cornwall on railway and mining construction then left for Adelaide on the ship Panama, arriving on 31 October 1850. A fellow passenger was W. W. R. Whitridge, with whom he was to strike a lasting friendship. He joined the rush to the Victorian goldfields but soon returned.

In 1851, he became second master at the newly established South Australian High School, but by the end of the year the venture had failed. Andrew Garran, who later published Garran's Book Almanack, was also involved in the project.

Headmaster Charles Gregory Feinaigle (c. 1817 – 10 March 1880), before 1860 spelled "Feinagle", opened a private academy at his residence Brandon on Unley Road, but was soon in Victoria, in a wide variety of vocations. He remained friends with Young; together they founded the Philosophical Society in January 1853, along with Whitridge, who by this time was editor of The Register, and he maintained active membership after he left Adelaide. Feinagle was lauded for accurately predicting the timing of the 1851 solar eclipse.

In December 1851, Young travelled overland to the Mount Alexander goldfields, returning to Adelaide on board the Elizabeth a few months later. He returned to the goldfields aboard the brig Louisa on 8 March and on 30 July arrived back in Adelaide aboard the Reliance. A letter later appears in the Register signed by Young and some passengers, referring to 'mutinous conduct' of the crew and commending the captain's efforts.

In 1852, Young was persuaded to open his own school at the rear of the old chapel in Ebenezer Street off Rundle Street East, and soon moved to larger premises in Stephens Place. His brother, Oliver Young, held classes for some time, and acted headmaster in 1860 while J. L. Young was away on recuperation leave, but returned to Cornwall in 1866. Oliver never married.

== Family ==
On 29 October 1855, John married first cousin Martha Paynter Young (c. 1829 – 6 April 1887). Their children included:

- first son Arago was born early in 1857 but died at Glenelg on 7 March 1859.
- Algernon Sidney Young (28 February 1858 – ) was born at their home in North Terrace. He was a noted player with the Norwood Football Club.
- John Hampden Young (26 August 1859 – 18 August 1861) was born at North Terrace
- Bertha Young (29 April 1861 – 15 August 1915) was born at Parkside, as were all succeeding children. She died in England.
- Edith Young (8 February 1863 – 11 July 1937)
- Ellen Young (30 December 1864 – 5 December 1923) died in England.
- Abraham Lincoln Young (8 June 1866 – 21 August 1917)
- John Howard Young (8 February 1868 – 23 October 1936) died in Otago, New Zealand. His will, dated 1924, by its omissions, indicates an antipathy to his father and siblings.
- Emily Young (26 March 1870 – 25 September 1875)
- Roland Hill Young (17 March 1873 – 17 June 1925) died in Perth, Western Australia.

None of Young's children had an academic career.

In 1861, he built the large two-storey Young House in Parkside, which was used both as his private residence and as a student boarding house. He then commissioned architects Wright and Hamilton to design and oversee building of a schoolhouse next door. (Edmund Wright had designed many prominent Adelaide buildings including the Town Hall). In 1871 he was able to relinquish the Freeman Street premises.

Young retired in 1880 and closed the school, intending to join his wife and family, who were visiting brother Oliver and their father in Veryan, Cornwall. A testimonial was held 17 December 1880 by his old scholars, and he was presented with a purse of sovereigns. His 16-room residence, with schoolhouse and various other houses on Young Street, after several auction attempts in February 1881, was eventually purchased by Alfred Allen Simpson (who coincidentally had also purchased the Gawler Place school property). The two Parkside buildings at 61–71 Young Street were sold by Alfred A., Fred N. and Violet Laura Simpson to Mr. C. O. A. Lapidge in 1922. "Young House" has since been demolished but the heritage-listed schoolhouse still stands.

He left for England on the steamer John Elder in 1881, but died on 26 July 1881 while crossing the Red Sea and was buried at sea. Martha returned to Adelaide, at first living in Kent Town then settled in Glenelg. She died 6 April 1887 aged 57.

Fred W. Sims, formerly Deputy Registrar of Companies in the Supreme Court, wrote in The Advertiser:

I could tell you quite a lot about John L. Young's school— 'dear old Johnny', as we used to call him ... Mr. Young possessed, among his other fine qualities, the saving grace of humor. It is recorded that his first two pupils were Caleb Peacock and John Partridge. He remarked at the time that, whether be met with success or not as a schoolmaster, he would anyway die "game".

== The Death of John Lorenzo Young ==
John Lorenzo Young died in 1881 during a sea voyage to Britain. A recollection of his death and burial appears in a collection of letters by Timothy Coop and Henry Exley, published in 1882. The letter reads as follows;

Our voyage over the Red Sea was full of the realest physical discomfort, from first to last – either hot head winds or none at all. Mr J. L.Young, a gentleman well known to many of our brethren in Adelaide, and who, after spending about 30 years in the colonies, was returning to end his days in England, through the excessive heat, was smitten with an apoplectic fit, and never rallied. Walking about on the deck early in the morning – at 9 o'clock in the evening we buried him in the Red Sea. It was very impressive to hear the ship's bell toll out its solemn funeral tones, as the moment of burial drew near. The body was placed, after due preparation on a board, with the feet out toward the sea, at the open port of the after square, and covered with the ship's ensign – its great red cross answering well to the dead man's form. The captain and a large number of the officers and passengers gathered around the scene. The Episcopalian funeral service was tenderly and impressively read by Mr Poole. At the moment when the body was about to be committed to the deep, the low call of the boatswain's whistle was heard, and the engines at once stood still; and as the words, "We therefore commit his body to the deep" fell from the minister's lips, the body was gently raised up by four strong servants of the ship, and suffered to slide from beneath its red cross covering into the solemn waters beneath. One short sound, as of a "gulp" was heard, when he at once sank beneath and beyond the action of the screw-propeller, the sighing, sobbing sea shrouding him 'round, and all was over

== Recognition ==
- Young Street, Parkside, on which his home and last schoolhouse were situated, was named for him.
- The J. L. Young Scholarship for Political Economy and the J. L. Young Research Scholarship at the University of Adelaide were established by Adelaide Educational Institution Old Scholars, notably including J. H. Finlayson, in his memory.
