= John Henry Chinner =

South Australian cartoonist

John Henry Chinner (30 June 1865 – 15 December 1933) was a South Australian artist, best known for his caricatures of prominent people.

== History ==
William Shierlaw, caricature by John Henry Chinner (1904).

Chinner was born in Brighton, South Australia, son of George Williams Chinner (c. 1824 – 27 May 1880), and his second wife Mary Chinner, née Edwards.

Chinner, pḕre, arrived in SA before 1847, had a drapery shop on Rundle Street. He married Caroline Bowen (c. 1831 – 29 April 1861) on 6 April 1849. By 1859 he was a Hindley Street publican, Mayor of Brighton in 1860 and longtime councillor. He married Mary Edwards on 8 September 1863.

In 1879 he was enrolled at Prince Alfred College as a boarder, and later was a prominent batsman in the annual cricket match against St Peter's College. (Note: His elder brother, the musician William Bowen Chinner (1850 – 2 July 1915) was educated at St Peter's College. See his article for more family details.)

This was the start of a lifelong commitment as an active member and finally president of the PAC Old Collegians' Association, longtime member of the College Committee and for 22 years the Council's Honorary Secretary.

The family moved to Parkside around 1880 and Chinner became involved with the local church literary society, taught bible classes, and was promoted by Alfred Catt to Sunday school superintendent. His devout, methodical, serious nature and no-nonsense leadership style made the Parkside Wesleyan Methodist Sunday school an example that other churches sought to emulate. His admiration for the Song of Australia as a National Anthem was tempered by Caroline Carleton's lack of reference to God, which Chinner made good with an additional verse:

There is a land, a morning land,
Which rose from nought at God's command,
Where peace and truth stand hand in hand;
Australia!
Lord, purge these shores suffused with light
From sins abhorrent to Thy sight,
Guard Thou with all Thy gracious might,
Australia! Australia! Australia!

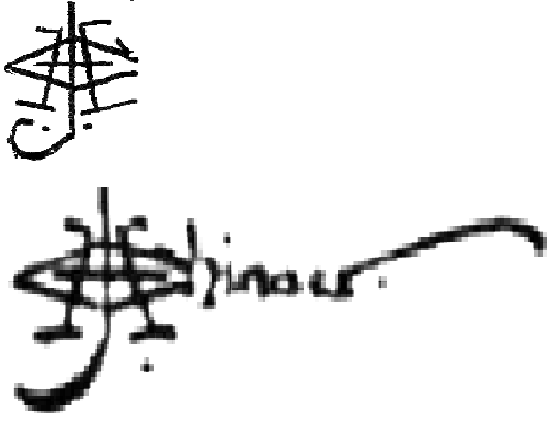

His interest in caricature was first shown with contributions to the Literary Society's magazine, in which he published sketches of fellow-members, and it was not long before his work was to be seen in the pages of Quiz, The Bulletin and London Punch. He was a Fellow of the South Australian Society of Arts, and was urged by H. P. Gill to make a profession of his hobby.

Outside these interests he was an accountant — he was for 31 years Adelaide manager for the Atlas Insurance Company, retiring in January 1925.

== Notable Citizens ==
Chinner produced a series of around 250 caricatures between 1923 and 1928 for the Adelaide Saturday Journal, No. 1 being of the South Australian Governor, Sir Tom Bridges.

Many of these were also carried by sister-publications The Register and The Observer.

The last of the series may have been of Charles Bastard, lessee of Adelaide's City Baths. Around 180 of these are listed below:

Name	Relevant article	Notes
Chinner monograms	This article	
Abe Shannon	Abe Shannon	pastoralist philanthropist
Albert Ernest Clarkson	H. L. Vosz	glass merchant
Albert James Hannan	Albert James Hannan	Crown Solicitor
Alec Bagot	Alec Bagot	politician
Alexander John McLachlan	Alexander McLachlan	
Alexander Vigors Benson	A. V. Benson	Port Adelaide Racing Club
Alfred Austin Lendon	A. A. Lendon	medico
Alfred C. Minchin	A. C. Minchin	zoo director
Alfred Edward Simpson	Alfred Edward Simpson	architect
Alfred Jabez Roberts	A. J. Roberts	business, sport
Alfred Norwood Day	A. N. Day	railways
Alick J. Murray	Alick J. Murray	pastoralist
Andrew Alexander Kirkpatrick	Andrew Kirkpatrick	
Andrew Douglas Young	Andrew Douglas Young	stockbroker
Angas Johnson	Angas Johnson	city health officer
Archibald Thomas Strong	Archibald Strong	scholar, poet
Arnold Edwin Victor Richardson	A. E. V. Richardson	
Arthur Graham Rymill	Arthur Graham Rymill	
Arthur Nutter Thomas	A. Nutter Thomas	
Arthur V. Kewney	Arthur V. Kewney	Victoria Racing Club
Benno Seppelt	Benno Seppelt	winemaker
Albert Edwin Hamilton	A. E. Hamilton	accountant, rose fancier
Bert Hinkler	Bert Hinkler	
Brailsford Robertson	Thorburn Brailsford Robertson	Adelaide Uni
Brian Wibberley	Brian Wibberley	Methodist
Cecil Thomas Madigan	Cecil Thomas Madigan	
Charles Bastard	Charles Bastard	manager, City Baths
Charles Edward Goldsmith	None	Savings bank
Charles Edward Owen Smyth	C. E. Owen Smyth	
Charles Fenner	Charles Fenner	technical education
Charles Hawkes Todd Connor	None	mill owner
Charles Howard Angas	Charles Howard Angas	
Charles Richmond Glover	Charles Richmond Glover	
Clem Hill	Clem Hill	
Coleman Phillipson	Coleman Phillipson	International Law
Darnley Naylor	Darnley Naylor	
David John Gordon	David Gordon	
Donald Reid	James Marshall & Co.	merchant
Douglas Mawson	Douglas Mawson	geologist
E Harold Davies	E. Harold Davies	
Ebenezer Daniel Hedley Virgo	None	stockowners' representative
Edgar John Field	None	public servant
Edgar Ravenswood Waite	Edgar Ravenswood Waite	
Edward Allan Farquhar	Edward Allan Farquhar	
Edward Erskine Cleland	Edward Erskine Cleland	lawyer
Edward Henry Rennie	Edward Rennie	
Edward Holdsworth Sugden	Edward Holdsworth Sugden	
Edward Howard Bakewell	E. H. Bakewell	
Edward Julius	Edward Julius	forestry
Edward Lucas MLC	Edward Lucas	
Edward S. Kiek	Edward S. Kiek	Congregationalist
Edward Wheewall Holden	Edward Holden	
Edwin Mitchell Smith	Edwin Mitchell Smith	surveyor-general
Ernest Maurice Sabine	None	police magistrate
Ernest Pringle Ramsay	Ernest Pringle Ramsay	deputy postmaster-general
Ferdinand Lucas Parker	F. L. Parker	parliamentary clerk
Francis Villeneuve Smith	Francis Smith	
Frank Lymer Gratton	Frank Lymer Gratton	1000 voice choir conductor
Frank Marlow	Frank Marlow	secretary football league
Frank Moulden	Frank Beaumont Moulden	
Frank Sandland Hone	Frank Sandland Hone	
Frederic Wood Jones	Frederic Wood Jones	
Frederick Allen Lakeman	James Marshall & Co.	merchant
Frederick Charles Bevan	Frederick Bevan	Conservatorium
Frederick George Scarfe	George Scarfe	of Harris, Scarfe & Co
Frederick Taylor Whitington	Fred T. Whitington	
Frederick William Birrell	Frederick William Birrell	
Frederick William Bullock	Frederick William Bullock	
Frederick William Richards	Frederick William Richards	
George A. J. Webb	George A. J. Webb	
George Brookman	George Brookman	
George Davidson (minister)	George Davidson	Presbyterian
George Edward Young	George Edward Young	
George Frederick Claridge	George Frederick Claridge	home for incurables
George Frederick Jenkins	George Frederick Jenkins	
George Giffen	George Giffen	
George Hubert Wilkins	George Hubert Wilkins	
George McEwin	George McEwin	councillor
George Richards Laffer	George Richards Laffer	
Gordon Richardson	Gordon Richardson	
Hans Heysen	Hans Heysen	
Harold Edward Winterbottom	Harold Edward Winterbottom	Chamber of Manufactures
Harold Gordon Darling	Harold Gordon Darling	
Harold Jack Finnis		Royal Agric. Soc.
Harold Septimus Power	Harold Septimus Power	
Harry Dove Young	Harry Dove Young	
Henri Benedictus van Raalte	H. van Raalte	Art Gallery
Henry Barwell	Henry Barwell	
Henry Tassie MLC 01	Henry Tassie	
Henry Thomas (miller)	Henry Thomas	
Herbert Allchurch		police prosecutor
Herbert Henry Ernest Russell		OBE
Herbert Mathew Hale		museum
Hermann Koeppen Wendt		
Horace Percy Beaver		town clerk
Immanuel Gotthold Reimann	Immanuel Gotthold Reimann	
James Arthur Seymour		Chalmer's church
James Ashton	James Ashton	
James Gartrell	James Gartrell	
James Hall		horse racing
James Hay Gosse	James Hay Gosse	
James Jelley	James Jelley	
James Marshall	James Marshall & Co.	
James McGuire (railways)	James McGuire	
James Percy Morice		clerk of parliament
James Richard Fowler		
James Sadler		
James Walters Kitto		deputy PMG
James Wigham McGregor		manufacturer
John Baird, Lord Stonehaven	John Baird, 1st Viscount Stonehaven	
John Cowan MLC	John Cowan	
John Frederick Bailey	John Frederick Bailey	
John George Bice	John George Bice	
John Gunn MHA	John Gunn	
John Henry Chinner	(this article)	artist, by his son
John Lloyd Price	John Lloyd Price	
John Marshall Reid		
John McInnes MHA	John McInnes	
John Millard Dunn	John Millard Dunn	
John Sincock		govt reporting staff
John Stoward Moyes	John Stoward Moyes	
John Verran	John Verran	
John White (South Australian painter)	John White	
Joseph Verco	Joseph Verco	
Josiah Symon	Josiah Symon	
Julian Bickersteth	Julian Bickersteth	
Kerr Grant	Kerr Grant	
Lachlan McTaggart		pastoralist
Lancelot Stirling	Lancelot Stirling	
Laurence Hotham Howie	Laurence Hotham Howie	
Legh Winser	Legh Winser	
Lennon Raws	John Garrard Raws	Chamber of Commerce
Leslie Penfold-Hyland	Leslie Penfold Hyland	
Leslie Salter		dried fruits board
Leslie Wilkie	Leslie Wilkie	
Lewis Cohen (mayor)	Lewis Cohen	
Lionel Gee		Mines Department
Lionel Laughton Hill	Lionel Laughton Hill	
Lionel Lindsay	Lionel Lindsay	
Malcolm McIntosh MHA	Malcolm McIntosh	
Maxwell Gavin Anderson		of Orient Line
Mellis Napier	Mellis Napier	
Napier Kyffin Birks	Napier Kyffin Birks	
Noel Augustin Webb		federal arbitration court
Norman Jolly	Norman Jolly	
Norman Murray Gladstone Gratton		Scotch College
Oscar Seppelt		
Oswald Vick Hoad		military commander
Owen Forbes Phillips	Owen Phillips	base commander Brig-Gen
Owen Hindmarsh Stephens		electoral college
P. William Vaughan	None	Commonwealth Bank
Patrick McMahon Glynn	Patrick McMahon Glynn	
Percy William Charlton Wise	Percy W. Wise	canon Wise
Raymond Lionel Leane	Raymond Lionel Leane	
Reginald Robert Stuckey		under-treasurer
Reginald Victor Wilson	Reginald Victor Wilson	
Richard Butler MHA	Richard Butler	
Richard Layton Butler	Richard Layton Butler	
Richard William Bennett		judge
Robert Duncan		
Robert Hugh Crawford	Robert Hugh Crawford	
Robert Scott Young		Bank of Adelaide
Robert William Chapman (engineer)	Robert William Chapman	
Samuel Albert White	Samuel Albert White	
Samuel Henry Prior	Samuel Prior	of The Bulletin
Samuel James Mitchell	Samuel James Mitchell	
Samuel Joshua Jacobs	Samuel Joshua Jacobs	
Samuel Perry	Samuel Perry	
Sid Torr		racehorse owner
Sidney Kidman	Sidney Kidman	
Stanley Bruce	Stanley Bruce	
Stanley Price Weir	Stanley Price Weir	
Sydney Talbot Smith	Sydney Talbot Smith	
Theodore George Bentley Osborn	Theodore George Bentley Osborn	
Thomas Henry Jones	Thomas Henry Jones	
Thomas Pascoe MLC	Thomas Pascoe	
Thomas Payne Bellchambers		naturalist
Thomas Shuldham O'Halloran KC	Thomas Shuldham O'Halloran KC	
Thomas Slaney Poole	Thomas Slaney Poole	
Tom Bridges	Tom Bridges	
Victor Ryan		tourist bureau
W. G. T. Goodman	W. G. T. Goodman	
Wallace Bruce		
Wallace Sandford	Wallace Sandford	
Walter Edwards Chinner		of Wilkinson & Co.
Walter Ernest Rogers 01		auditor-general
Walter Gill	Walter Gill	
Walter Gordon Duncan	Walter Gordon Duncan	
Whitmore Blake Carr	Whitmore Blake Carr	
Will Ashton	Will Ashton	
William Alfred Webb	William Alfred Webb	
William Bennett (headmaster)	William Bennett	
William Hague MHA	William Hague	
William Henry Foote	William Henry Foote	
William Henry Jeanes		SA Cricket Assn
William Henry Jeffries	William Jeffries (minister)	Methodist conference
William Herbert Phillipps	William Herbert Phillipps	
William Hutchinson Robinson		Methodist conference
William Jethro Brown	William Jethro Brown	
William John Colebatch		Roseworthy College
William John Hill		both (Adel, Assoc) Chambers of Commerce
William John Masson		
William John Warren		State Bank
William Joseph Denny	William Joseph Denny	
William Mitchell (philosopher)	William Mitchell	
William Percival Nicholls		Pulteney Grammar
William Ramsay Smith	William Ramsay Smith	
William Reynolds Bayly	William Reynolds Bayly	
William Rooke Creswell	William Rooke Creswell	
William Taylor McCoy		director of educ.
William Thomas Shapley	William Thomas Shapley	of Methodist conference
William Thornborough Hayward	William Thornborough Hayward	

James Alfred Pearce (1873–1944) drew caricatures in a similar style for the Adelaide News in a series entitled "Familiar Figures" in 1930. No. 19, Frank L. Gratton may be viewed here. Pearce was born in Burra to Cornish parents. Lionel Coventry (1906–1986) was a later News caricaturist, seen here and here (F. L. Parker in 1945 and 1949 respectively)

== Other interests ==
Although Chinner was best known for his caricatures, he was also a fine painter in watercolors.

He was also known for his skill as a poet, particularly as a hymnwriter.

He was deeply involved in municipal affairs, and was a longtime member of the Unley Council and served as mayor.

He was a board member of the Epworth Book Depot for over thirty years.

Chinner was also one of four trustees of a charitable fund established by businessman and former Unley mayor William Shierlaw to support the education and training of candidates for the Methodist ministry.

He was a lifelong supporter of Prince Alfred College in every aspect of its activities.

== Family ==
Chinner married Harriet Agnes Wallace (died 22 September 1948) at Parkside Wesleyan Church on 11 September 1889. Their children were:

- Mary Wallace Chinner (3 October 1890 – ) married Robert Harold Davidson in 1919
- Dorothy Agnes Chinner (27 March 1892 – 1916)
- Marjorie Wallace Chinner (29 August 1894 – ) married James Montrose Maughan in 1919
- Harry Wallace Chinner (26 December 1896 – 11 July 1975)
- John Wallace Chinner (5 March 1901 – 1972)

They had a home at 33 Foster street, Parkside.
