= G. Wood, Son & Co. =

Wholesale grocery business in Adelaide, founded 1876

G. Wood, Son & Co. was a major wholesale grocery business founded in Adelaide, South Australia, Australia, founded in 1876 by Gilbert Wood, his son Peter Wood, and James Gartrell.

== History ==
G. Wood, Son & Co. had its origin in a grocery store established by Gilbert Wood in Angas Street around 1855. He took on James Gartrell as clerk, then in 1876 established G. Wood, Son & Co. as a partnership of himself, his son Peter Wood, and Gartrell.

William Menz worked for the company around the 1860s, before going on to take over the grocery store founded by his mother.

Shortly after the death of Gilbert Wood in September 1886, South Australia experienced a depression brought about by a succession of poor seasons, the collapse of the Commercial Bank of South Australia and the Town and Country Bank. Many businesses folded, but by hard work and perseverance the company survived the crisis. After that the business became increasingly prosperous, and new and substantial premises were erected on North Terrace. Wood and Gartrell thereupon determined that they would thenceforth devote a percentage of their profits to charities and good works, considering they owed their good fortune to God.

== Gilbert Wood ==
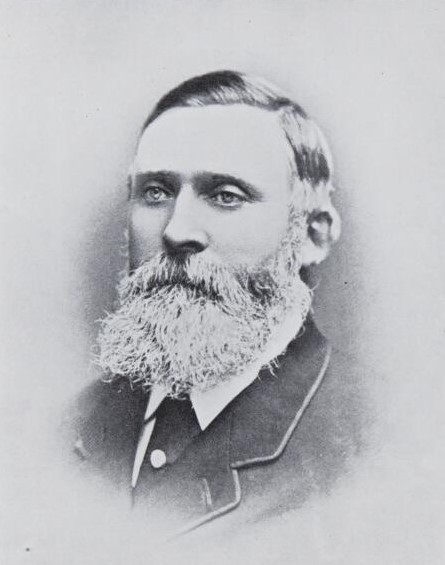

Gilbert Williamson Wood JP (2 September 1828 – 24 September 1886) was the founder of G. Wood, Son & Co., wholesale grocers in the early days of the colony of South Australia.

=== History ===
Wood was born in Muckle Roe in the Shetland Islands and came out to Australia as chief mate on the brig Seaton out of Aberdeen. His brother Gifford commanded the ship. He left the ship in Melbourne and captained the schooner Grenada, plying between the various colonies at the time of the Victorian gold rush. Around 1855 he opened a grocery store in Angas Street, Adelaide, which was a success, and after a few years moved his operations to Rundle Street.

In 1876 he founded the company G. Wood, Son & Co. with his son Peter and James Gartrell, for many years his chief clerk, with premises at 198 Rundle Street and Lipson Street, Port Adelaide.

He died of a heart attack after a holiday in England; his will was proved at £25,770.

=== Other interests ===
He was for 17 years a deacon of Clayton Congregational Church, Kensington.

=== Family ===
He married Ann Fraser, born Muckle Roe, Shetland Islands (1 July 1829 – 27 November 1920); they had seven daughters and four sons, four of whom died in infancy. They lived at "Seaton Cottage", Magill Road, North Kensington:

- Peter Wood (22 June 1855 – 21 December 1921) married Alice Maude Johnson on 23 May 1882
- John Wood (16 October 1856 – 10 May 1857)
- Agnes Wood (7 May 1858 – 29 August 1858)
- Grace Wood (20 June 1859 3 November 1861)
- Elizabeth Wood (17 July 1861 – 26 November 1862)
- Annie Wood (14 Sep 1863 – 23 Oct 1947) married solicitor James Henderson on 22 June 1887
- Margaret "Maggie" Wood (28 Sep 1865 – 26 Mar 1935) married Henderson of Coolgardie on 27 April 1898
- Jessie Wood (7 July 1867 – 25 May 1902) married Scott Young on 23 January 1889
- Caroline "Carrie" Wood (12 May 1869 – 6 Jun 1934) married mine manager Edward James Horwood (son of Joel Horwood) on 9 April 1890
- Gilbert Charles "Bertie" Wood (3 March 1871 – 8 July 1917)
- William Wood (5 May 1873 – 8 Oct 1948)

Charles Wood (c. 1823 – 11 October 1872), of Flinders Street, Adelaide, was a brother.

== Peter Wood ==
Peter Wood (22 June 1855 – 21 December 1921), eldest son of Gilbert Wood, followed his father as head of G. Wood, Son and Co.

=== History ===
Peter was born in Adelaide, and after leaving school joined his father's company, to which he was admitted as partner shortly after he turned 21. On the death of his father, Peter, who had shown remarkable business acumen and ability, took over the management of the business in partnership with James Gartrell. He built a new and imposing premises on North Terrace and in 1920 turned the private partnership into a limited liability company. He was particularly successful in forging business links with fruit growers in Renmark and along the River Murray.

=== Other interests ===
Peter Wood followed his father in religious observances and philanthropic interests. He was senior deacon of the Clayton Church and superintendent of its Sunday School for many years, and associated in other works of that Congregationalist Church alongside Sir Edwin Smith.

He took a particular interest in the victims of the Loch Sloy shipwreck, and in the Citizens' Relief Committee formed in conjunction with the visit of the Duke and Duchess of Cornwall and York (later King George V. and Queen Mary). He was on numerous boards and committees associated with the Boys' Brigade, the City Mission, and Our Boys' Institute, Boy Scouts Association, Y.M.C.A., Y.W.C.A., Minda Home, Deaf and Dumb Institution, the Zoological Gardens and the Adelaide Workmen's Homes, Incorporated. He was associated with the town planning movement, vice-president of the Commonwealth Club and an active member of the Adelaide Caledonian Society. He was a member of the Burnside District Council for 34 years, and its chairman for the last five. He was a member of the Liberal Union and urged to stand for Parliament.

He was a director of the Victorian Insurance Company, Silver & Co., and Walton's Limited.

He was a first-rate shot and expert horse rider. He raised Jersey cattle and was successful in the ring at the Royal Adelaide Show. One of his cows, Maid of Tarraganda, broke the State record for milk production. He had a private zoo at his beautiful home at Burnside, including a fine herd of deer, which he purchased from William Gilbert of Pewsey Vale.

=== Family ===
Peter Wood married Alice Maud Johnson (10 Jun 1862 – 20 Jul 1945) on 25 March 1882. Their children included:

- Maude Wood (23 Apr 1884 – 5 Aug 1974) married G. S. Tyler
- Gilbert Wood (24 Apr 1885 – 10 Jun 1965)
- Alison Wood (28 Jul 1889 – 25 November 1933)
- Robert Wood (8 Apr 1891 – 18 May 1964)
- Linden Wood (28 Feb 1902 – 9 Jun 1952)
- Annie Wood (21 Nov 1894 – 22 Oct 1987)
- Colin Wood (2 Jan 1905 – 10 Dec 1953)

He was buried in the Clayton Church graveyard.

== James Gartrell ==
James Gartrell (1 December 1846 – 13 December 1925) was a founder of G. Wood, Son & Co.

=== History ===
Gartrell was born in Goldsithney, Cornwall on 1 December 1846, son of John and Elizabeth ( – 1 August 1895) and left with his parents for South Australia in the ship John Murray, arriving in 1848. His father first worked at the Burra copper mines, then after three years moved to Adelaide. He did not survive long, dying in 1853. James was educated at Thomas Burgan's school in Gilles Street, and at the age of 16 he entered the law office of (later Justice) W. A. Wearing, but left after three years and in 1866 began working for Gilbert Wood as chief clerk, working from 7 a.m. till 10 p.m. Then he became a partner in the business, on equal terms with the proprietor's son, and managed, with Gilbert Wood then with his son Peter Wood), the huge wholesale grocery business, with connections throughout Australia.

=== Interests ===
He was for many years been a generous supporter and trustee of the Kent Town Methodist Church. Around 1913 that church founded a new Methodist church at Rose Park, and Gartrell paid for the pipe organ and contributed generously to its building, which was named the Gartrell Memorial Church in his honour after it was built in 1915 to a design by Adelaide architect Herbert Jory. He was accorded a gracious eulogy by Rev. Brian Wibberley. The church was state heritage-listed in November 1989.

He was a supporter of Minda Home, the Royal Institution for the Blind, and the Children's Hospital. He was an active member of the Adelaide Chamber of Commerce, and its president in 1900–1901 and 1905–1908. He was treasurer of the Methodist Ladies' College, a member of the committee of Prince Alfred College vice-president of the Royal Institution for the Blind, and supporter and president of the Adelaide Benevolent and Strangers' Friend Society.

He took an active interest in the Memorial Hospital.

=== Family ===
He married Sarah Noble Lawrence (ca.1856 – 8 March 1935); they lived at "Fernilee", Greenhill Road, Burnside.

- elder daughter Adeline married Arthur Mellor on 18 March 1891
- Elsie May Gartrell married Cecil Vincent Heath on 20 May 1903; lived at Rose Park

John H. Gartrell of East Terrace was a brother.

== See also ==
- D. & J. Fowler Ltd.
