= A. J. Roberts =

Australian businessman and Australian rules footballer

Alfred Roberts OBE

Personal information
- Full name: Alfred Jabez Roberts
- Born: 7 April 1863; Norwood, South Australia
- Died: 3 July 1939 (aged 76); Glenelg, South Australia
- Position: Follower

Playing career
Years	Club	Games (Goals)
1880–1881	Kensington	
1882	South Park	
1883–1891	Norwood	104 (20)

Career highlights
- 4x Norwood premiership player (1883, 1887,1888, 1889); Norwood Captain: 1886; Norwood Football Club Life Member (1909); Norwood Football Hall of Fame (2024)

Alfred Jabez Roberts (7 April 1863 – 3 July 1939), generally referred to as A. J. Roberts, was a South Australian businessman and sporting identity.

== History ==
Roberts was born Jabez Alfred Roberts at Queen street, Norwood, son of William Henry Roberts and Ellen Roberts (26 June 1829 – 28 March 1907), née Wearing, a sister of Justice Wearing. His father ran the flour mill on West Terrace, Adelaide. He was educated at the Norwood Grammar School and Wesley College, Melbourne, and gained employment first with G. Wood, Son & Co., and then the Bank of Adelaide. In 1882 he got a position with W. L. Ware's firm of accountants, then inn 1888 went into business for himself as company secretary and accountant. Later that year he purchased a seat on the Stock Exchange, of which he was elected president in 1906. Around 1895 he went into partnership with Davenport and Smith, (Note: Stow Smith was his uncle) stockbrokers, who had an office in the Bank of Australasia Chambers, and subsequently opened an office in London for Alfred Davenport (1861–1919), who was a nephew of Sir Samuel Davenport.

During the war he remained a member of the Stock Exchange, but handed the work to his accountant, Cyril Walter Larkins, devoting his energies to patriotic activities, for which he received an OBE in 1918. He sold his seat on the Stock Exchange in 1928.

He died on 3 July 1939 in a private hospital at Glenelg and his remains were buried at St Jude's Church, Brighton.

== Other activities ==
Roberts was elected mayor of the City of Glenelg in 1899, 1901 and 1916, this last in competition with J. H. S. Olifent. In 1901 he entertained the Duke and Duchess of York, who, when on a visit to the State, visited Glenelg. He was elected to the Adelaide City Council in 1904 for the Hindmarsh Ward, then was elected unopposed for another two years.

He was appointed to the boards of several firms: South British Insurance Co., Timms Reinforced Timber Co., Adelaide Cement Co., and Cowell Bros (timber and hardware merchants in Sydenham Rd, Norwood, founded by Henry James and James William Cowell in 1884, purchased in 1905 by Quinton Stow Smith, Roberts and Francis Henry Cowell)

He served as chairman of Millers Lime Ltd. and managing director of Tyrone Farming Co., Loxton

== Sporting ==
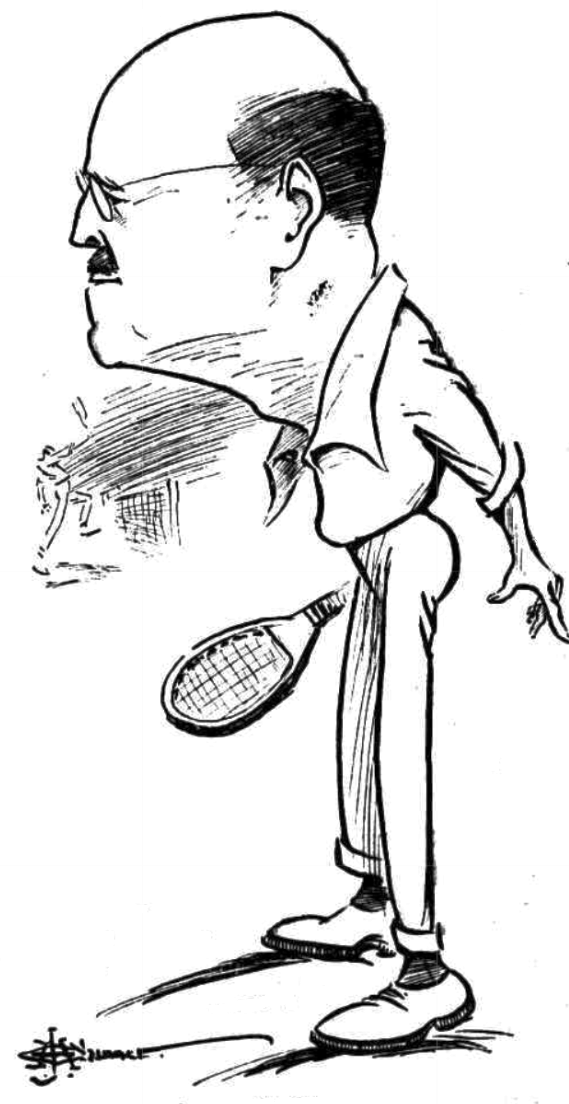
caricature by J. H. Chinner

Roberts was captain of the Norwood Football Club in 1886 and largely instrumental in reforming the Association in 1888.

In 1904 Roberts founded the Glenelg Bowling Club.

He played tennis for many years, and on one occasion represented the State in Victoria. He was president of the Lawn Tennis Association 1902–1904. In 1914 he accompanied the Davis Cup team to London as honorary manager, and a month later returned to Australia by the Lusitania, which was subsequently torpedoed. He was president of the Association again in 1915 and most years 1920–1930. He was made a life member in 1933.

He was president of the Glenelg Golf Club 1927–1929

== Family ==
Roberts married Isabel Joyce (c. 1866 – 16 April 1946). Their family includes:

- (Kenelm) Roy Roberts (7 October 1890 – ), of Kadina, South Australia
- Ewart Kingsley "King" Roberts (3 July 1894 – ), of Newcastle, New South Wales
- Clive Roberts (30 October 1897 – 9 January 1917) enlisted with 3rd Light Horse, killed in action, Rafa, Egypt
- Geoffrey Lincoln "Geoff" Roberts, (7 August 1905 – ) of Adelaide

They had a home "The Olives" on High street, Glenelg.
