= Stow Smith =

South Australian businessman (1864–1963)

Quinton Stow Smith (7 April 1864 – 10 June 1963), was a South Australian businessman, philanthropist and longtime active lay member of the Baptist Church.

== History ==
Smith was born in Beaumont, South Australia, the youngest child of James Smith and his wife Augusta Smith, née Wearing, a sister of Justice Wearing. He was named for Rev. Thomas Quinton Stow (1801–1862), a friend of his father who married the couple on 25 November 1845. He grew up on the family property "Karrayerta" on Fullarton Rd, Fullarton, and was educated at Adelaide Educational Institution.

In 1879 he started work as an office boy for schoolmate Frederick William Bullock (1851–1931), who had just taken over his late father's land agency business in York Chambers, Franklin Street, and stayed with him until 1888.

He then joined Samuel Alfred Davenport (1861–1919), a nephew of Sir Samuel Davenport, who had an office in the Bank of Australasia Chambers. In December 1889 he and Davenport formed a partnership Davenport & Smith, stockbrokers, with offices in Alfred Chambers, Currie Street, later Davenport, Smith, & Roberts with the addition of Smith's cousin Alfred Jabez Roberts (1863–1939), mayor of Glenelg 1899–1902, 1916–1917. Smith was a Director of Valkyrie Gold Mining Company.

In 1905 Smith, Roberts and F. H. Cowell purchased the business of Cowell Brothers timber merchants (incorporated in 1910), of which Smith became chairman of directors, and his son Harold managing director, with Smith serving on its board until his 99th birthday.

== Other interests ==
Smith was:

- a long-standing supporter of the Flinders Street Baptist Church
- the first lay president of the Baptist Union of Australia (1929–1932).
- treasurer of the Baptist church building fund for over 50 years
- vice-president of the World Baptist Alliance for several years.
- associated with the Adelaide Benevolent Society for over 50 years; the Stow Smith Homes for the Aged at Firle were named in his honour.
- a longtime vice-president of the British and Foreign Bible Society
- a longtime vice-president of the Aborigines' Friends' Association.

== Family ==
Smith married Emily Henrietta Cooper (c. 1870 – 8 November 1947) in 1891. They had 3 daughters and 2 sons:

- Dorothy Edna Smith (28 June 1892 – ) married Harold Bayard Piper (c. 1893 – 10 May 1953) on 7 June 1922. Piper, a barrister, was appointed to the Arbitration Court in 1938, later served as Chief Judge. also on board of BHP.
- Averil Constance Smith (1894–1980) married Arthur Towers Matters on 11 September 1919. He was a real estate agent of Glenelg.
- Harold Stow Smith (1896– ) married Gladwyn Affleck Kerr on 9 May 1923
- Dudley Stow Smith (1898– ) married Margaret Agnes Bruce on 15 November 1923
- (Gladys) Mary Smith (1902– ) married Clem Bowen Chinner ( – 19 March 1952) in 1936.

They had a home "Carrayerta" or "Karrayerta" on Fullarton Road, Fullarton. After his wife died (in 1947) he sold the family property to the SA Housing Trust (in 1953) and went to live at 15 Cross Road, Kingswood. The second generation used "Stow Smith" as though it were a (non-hyphenated) double-barrelled surname.
