= Port Adelaide Cup =

- Class: Listed
- Location: Morphettville Racecourse, South Australia
- Inaugurated: 1906
- Race type: Thoroughbred
- Sponsor: HKJC World Pool (2026)

Race information
- Distance: 2,500 metres
- Surface: Turf
- Track: Left-handed
- Qualification: Horses three years old and older
- Weight: Quality handicap
- Purse: $120,240 (2026)

The Port Adelaide Cup is a South Australian Jockey Club Listed Thoroughbred horse race for horses aged three years old and over, at quality handicap conditions, over a distance of 2,500 metres at the Morphettville Racecourse, Adelaide, Australia in the Autumn Carnival.

== History ==
The race has assumed the history of the Port Adelaide Cup after the closure of Cheltenham Park Racecourse in 2009.

The race was the principal long distance race of the Port Adelaide Racing Club. It was held initially in the Christmas holiday period. However, after the demise of the club in 1975 and later the closure of the track where the race was predominantly held the race had lost its prestige when it was downgraded to a Listed race in 2003. The current SAJC has had less stability with the scheduling of the race having it run in February several times in the last 10 years.

=== Name ===
- prior 2014 - Port Adelaide Cup
- 2015 - Japan Trophy
- 2016 - Port Adelaide Cup

=== Grade ===
- 1908–1985 - Principal Race
- 1979–2002 - Group 3
- 2003–2012 - Listed Race
- 2014 - Listed race

=== Venue ===
- 1906–1941 - Cheltenham Park
- 1943 - Victoria Park Racecourse
- 1944 - Morphettville
- 1945–1980 - Cheltenham Park
- 1981–1989 - Morphettville
- 1990–2009 - Cheltenham Park
- 2010 - Morphettville Parks (inner course)
- 2011 onwards - Morphettville

=== Distance ===
- 1906–1907 - 1 1/2 miles (~2400 metres)
- 1908–1909 - 1 1/8 miles (~1800 metres)
- 1910–1917 - 1 3/8 miles (~2200 metres)
- 1918–1920 - 1 1/2 miles (~2400 metres)
- 1921–1941 - 1 7/8 miles (~3050 metres)
- 1943 - 1 3/8 miles (~2200 metres)
- 1944 – 2 miles (~3200 metres)
- 1945–1972 - 1 7/8 miles (~3050 metres)
- 1973–1974 – 3050 metres
- 1975–1980 – 2400 metres
- 1981–1984 – 2500 metres
- 1985–2001 – 2400 metres
- 2002 – 2410 metres
- 2003–2005 – 2400 metres
- 2006–2010 – 2250 metres
- 2012 – 2019 metres
- 2013 onwards – 2500 metres

== Winners ==
The following are past winners of the race.

- 2026 - Alainge
- 2025 - Sir Kingsford
- 2024 - The Map (Aus)
- 2023 - Hasta La War (Aus)
- 2022 - Splendiferous (Aus)
- 2021 - Wyclif (GB)
- 2020 - Oceanex (NZ)
- 2019 - Valac (Ire)
- 2018 - Yogi (NZ)
- 2017 - Time to Test (Aus)
- 2016 - Zanteca
- 2015 - Go Dreaming
- 2014 - Ominous
- 2013 - Not held
- 2012 - Finiguerra
- 2011 - Maunatrice
- 2010 - Right Fong
- 2009 - Foolish Lad
- 2008 - Richracer
- 2007 - Wells Street
- 2006 - Tingirana
- 2005 - †race not held
- 2004 - Mr. Tambourineman
- 2003 - Odysseus
- 2002 - Moongara
- 2001 - Astrolante
- 2000 - Rydell High
- 1999 - King's Landing
- 1998 - Vestey
- 1997 - Voodoo Beat
- 1996 - Supercut
- 1995 - Slygo Connection
- 1994 - Ruling Knight
- 1993 - Guessing Game
- 1992 - Rasputin's Revenge
- 1991 - Alphabel
- 1990 - Leahlauda
- 1989 - Master Eclipse
- 1988 - Jolly Good Thought
- 1987 - Hollinger
- 1986 - Keepers
- 1985 - Game Trooper
- 1984 - Noble Falcon
- 1983 - Barmax
- 1982 - Darado Boy
- 1981 - Lady Nurmi
- 1980 - Rock Show
- 1979 - Diecaster
- 1978 - Linkman
- 1977 - Rain Circle
- 1976 - Classic Conquest
- 1975 - Strong Bow
- 1974 - Brugan
- 1973 - Brugan
- 1972 - Caliente
- 1971 - Caliente
- 1970 - Moomba Fox
- 1969 - Cartier
- 1968 - Jovial Knight
- 1967 - Floodbird
- 1966 - Jovial Knight
- 1965 - Bright Blend
- 1964 - Hunting Horn
- 1963 - Barbatook
- 1962 - Delville
- 1961 - Wine Label
- 1960 - Rose Of Summer
- 1959 - Sir Blink
- 1958 - Trois Model
- 1957 - Power Dive
- 1956 - Valpadi
- 1955 - Chatford
- 1954 - Beau Regis
- 1953 - Welloch
- 1952 - Sun Kist
- 1951 - Free Kick
- 1950 - Prince O' Fairies
- 1949 - Sanctus
- 1948 - Chievely
- 1947 - Bannerette
- 1946 - Baycades
- 1945 - Rainbird
- 1944 - Saint Warden
- 1943 - Saint Warden
- 1942 - †race not held
- 1941 - Renown
- 1940 - Apostrophe
- 1939 - Indignity
- 1938 - Grecian Princess
- 1937 - St. Fox
- 1936 - Yarro
- 1935 - Amalia
- 1934 - ‡Mellion / Supervalve
- 1933 - Silvado
- 1932 - Mary Spa
- 1931 - Celotex
- 1930 - Madstar
- 1929 - Nadean
- 1928 - Some Quality
- 1927 - Frilford
- 1926 - Parvista
- 1925 - Lemina
- 1924 - Lemina
- 1923 - Stand By
- 1922 - Black Rogue
- 1921 - Pop Pop
- 1920 - Paratoo
- 1919 - Alacrity
- 1918 - Pistol Prince
- 1917 - Bangonie
- 1916 - Admirable Bob
- 1915 - Pistolier
- 1914 - Bangonie
- 1913 - Calamus
- 1912 - Balmoral
- 1911 - Kirn
- 1910 - Fastness
- 1909 - Carl Dour
- 1908 - Becky
- 1907 - Metal Queen
- 1906 - Enigma

† Race not held in that year due to switch race date in the racing calendar. The SAJC moved the race to the late summer for the 2005–06 racing season. Originally the race was held during the PARC Christmas Carnival.
¶ Race not held due to a ban on war time racing in the state.
‡ Dead heat

== See also ==
- Group races
- List of Australian Group races
- Queen's Cup (horse race), a national race sometimes held in Adelaide
