= A. V. Benson =

Australian medical practitioner and sports enthusiast (1869 – 1939)

Alexander Vigors Benson (1869 – 23 December 1939) was a medical doctor and sports enthusiast, for 24 years chairman of the Port Adelaide Racing Club and president of the Port Adelaide Football Club for 14.

== History ==
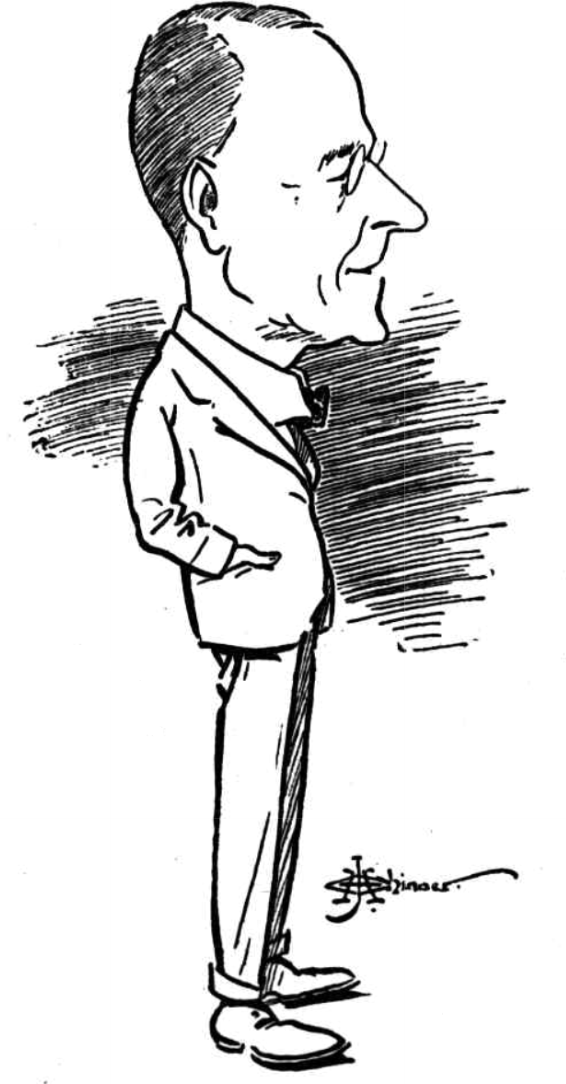
Caricature by J. H. Chinner

Benson was born in Kensington, South Australia, a son of Dr. John Benson, who had a practice in Norwood, and educated at St Peter's College. He qualified in pharmacy at the University of Adelaide and from 1891 to 1896 served at the Mount Gambier Hospital as dispenser and assistant medical officer. He was active in the town's sporting and social scene — President of the Mount Gambier Football Association, and Captain of the Mount Gambier Football Club. He married a daughter of the National Bank manager, then left Australia to gain further qualifications in medicine and surgery in London and Brussels

On returning to Adelaide he set up in practice in the Port Adelaide district and lived at Buller Terrace, Alberton, their home until around 1930, when they moved to Prospect.

He volunteered for service with the First AIF in the early stages of the Great War, and from August 1917 served in Egypt at the No. 14 General Hospital and No. 2 Stationary Hospital. He was, as Major Benson, "taken off strength" in October 1918, suffering from intermittent albuminuria and invalided to Australia.

=== Sporting ===
He was a member of the Port Adelaide Rowing Club from 1907 and vice-president in 1909

He was a longtime member of the Port Adelaide Racing Club, a vice-president in 1913 and chairman from 1915 to 1939. He owned, in partnership with a few friends, several racehorses of which Princess Aides was perhaps the best.

He was president of the Port Adelaide Football Club 1913–1927.

He was elected to the committee of the South Australian Jockey Club in 1924. He was largely responsible for the formation in 1934 of a school for apprentices, run by Syd Ferry (1877–1945), son of Seth Ferry.

Though not a bowls player, he was president of the Alberton Bowling Club for two years.

=== Other interests ===
Benson was an active Freemason, Past Master of St. Peter's College Lodge, Past Principal of the Royal Arch Chapter, a Knight Templar, and a Mark Mason.

Sponsored by the S.A.J.C., he was a prominent contender for presidency of the "Liars' Club", a one-off fundraising competition organised by The Advertiser and its sister radio station 5AD in 1937, in aid of crippled children.

== Personal ==
Benson married Jane Flett "Jeanie" Loutit (1871–1955), daughter of Andrew Loutit, at Mount Gambier on 23 January 1906. It appears they had no children.

He died at his home on Prospect Road, Prospect after several years of failing health, and his cremated remains were interred at the North Road Cemetery.
