= Patrick Duffy (disambiguation) =

Patrick Duffy (born 1949) is an American television actor, best known for the role of Bobby Ewing on Dallas.

Patrick Duffy may also refer to:

== Politicians ==
- Paddy Duffy (SDLP politician) (1933–1996), Irish nationalist politician
- Patrick Duffy (Cumann na nGaedheal politician) (1875–1946), Irish Cumann na nGaedhael politician
- Patrick Duffy (British politician) (1920–2026), British politician

== Sports ==
- Paddy Duffy (1864–1890), Irish-American boxer
- Patrick Duffy (fencer) (1921–1987), Irish Olympic fencer
- Pat Duffy (born 1975), American professional skateboarder

== Others ==
- Patrick Duffy (bishop) (died 1675), 17th century Bishop of Clogher
- Patrick Vincent Duffy (1832–1909), Irish landscape painter, keeper of RHA
- Patrick Duffy (murder victim) (1933–1973), IRA murder victim
- Patrick Michael Duffy (born 1943), U.S. federal judge
