= Eucalyptus remota =

Kangaroo Island ash

Conservation status
- Near Threatened (IUCN 3.1)

Scientific classification
- Kingdom: Plantae
- Clade: Tracheophytes
- Clade: Angiosperms
- Clade: Eudicots
- Clade: Rosids
- Order: Myrtales
- Family: Myrtaceae
- Genus: Eucalyptus
- Species: E. remota

Binomial name
- Eucalyptus remota Blakely

Species of eucalyptus

Eucalyptus remota, commonly known as the Kangaroo Island ash, Kangaroo Island mallee ash, or Mount Taylor mallee, is a species of tree or mallee that is endemic to Kangaroo Island in South Australia. It has smooth bark, often with rough, fibrous bark on the trunk, lance-shaped adult leaves, flower buds in a group of between nine and twenty one, white flowers and hemispherical or shortened spherical fruit.

== Description ==
Eucalyptus remota is a tree that typically grows to a height of 15 m (49 ft), sometimes a mallee to 4 m (13 ft), and forms a lignotuber. It has smooth, greyish or yellow bark, usually with rough, fibrous grey bark on the trunk, sometimes also the larger branches. Young plants and coppice regrowth have elliptical to egg-shaped or broadly lance-shaped leaves that are the same shade of greyish green on both sides, and 50–105 mm (2.0–4.1 in) long, 30–45 mm (1.2–1.8 in) wide. Adult leaves are the same shade of glossy green on both sides, lance-shaped to curved, 75–150 mm (3.0–5.9 in) long and 20–40 mm (0.79–1.57 in) wide on a petiole 14–25 mm (0.55–0.98 in) long. The flower buds are arranged in leaf axils in groups of between nine and twenty one on an unbranched peduncle 6–18 mm (0.24–0.71 in) long, the individual buds on pedicels 1–6 mm (0.039–0.236 in) long. Mature buds are oval or club-shaped, 4–6 mm (0.16–0.24 in) long and 3–4 mm (0.12–0.16 in) wide with a rounded operculum that is shorter than the floral cup. Flowering occurs from November to December and the flowers are white. The fruit is a woody, hemispherical or shortened spherical capsule 6–10 mm (0.24–0.39 in) long and 5–105 mm (0.20–4.13 in) wide with the valves near rim level.

== Taxonomy and naming ==
Eucalyptus remota was first formally described in 1934 William Blakely in his book, A Key to the Eucalypts from specimens collected on Kangaroo Island by Walter Gill in 1907. The specific epithet (remota) is from the Latin word remotus, referring to the location of this species being distant from those of its nearest relatives.

== Distribution and habitat ==
Kangaroo Island ash is found on the western end of Kangaroo Island off the coast of South Australia where it grows on gravelly sands and loams over laterite in low mallee shrubland. It is found from Mount Taylor to Flinders Chase National Park.

== Conservation status ==
The IUCN Red List assesses the species as Near Threatened.

== Use in horticulture ==
Although not widely cultivated, E. remota is suitable for windbreaks or low shade areas and will grow quickly in sandy, acid type soils.

== See also ==
- List of Eucalyptus species
