= Margaret Saunders (artist) =

Irish artist

- Self portrait dated 1914
- Born: Margaret Elizabeth Saunders; 1882; Dublin, Ireland
- Died: 1959 (aged 76–77); Western Australia
- Occupation: artist

Margaret Saunders (1882 – 1959) was an Irish portrait painter and pastellist, print maker and teacher. She was a founder and first president of the Western Australia Women's Society of Fine Arts and Crafts.

== Life ==
Margaret Elizabeth Saunders was born in Dublin, and studied at the Dublin Metropolitan School of Art. She trained in the Royal Hibernian Academy under Patrick Vincent Duffy from the early 1900s, exhibiting with the academy between 1904 and 1918. Snoddy assumes that she married, and that she may have earlier exhibited under a different name.

While in Ireland she executed pastel portraits of known artists of the time including Duffy, Alexander Williams, and others such as Mrs Richard Maunsell. She was also a member of the United Arts Club. Her addresses included 14 Leinster Street, 18 Dawson Street, 118 St Stephen's Green and 51 Upper Leeson Street, living with Mrs Ada Saunders, a nurse.

She emigrated to Perth, Western Australia around 1920 to join family there. She was appointed assistant to Henri van Raalte at the Perth School of Art, and later succeeding him as principal until 1937. She also taught at secondary school level from the late 1920s into the 1930s at Perth Technical School from 1929 to 1935, and at St Mary's Church of England School for Girls. She was described as playing "incalculably important part in the development" of fine art in Western Australia in 1949.

Saunders worked in watercolour and pastel, as well as lino and woodcuts, exhibiting with the Western Australia Society of Arts in the 1920s and 1930s. She was a founder and the first president of the Western Australia Women's Society of Fine Arts and Crafts (later known as the Women Painters and Applied Arts Society), exhibiting with the society in 1936, 1937, 1939, 1940, 1941 and 1945. He work was featured in the 1942 Exhibition of Paintings and Drawings organised by the War Art Council. She also exhibited with the Institute of Artists, of which she was a founding member.

She died in 1959. Snoddy records the death of a Margaret Elizabeth Saunders, a widow, in Staines, Middlesex on 7 November 1918 in his entry for Saunders.
