= H. van Raalte =

Australian artist and printmaker

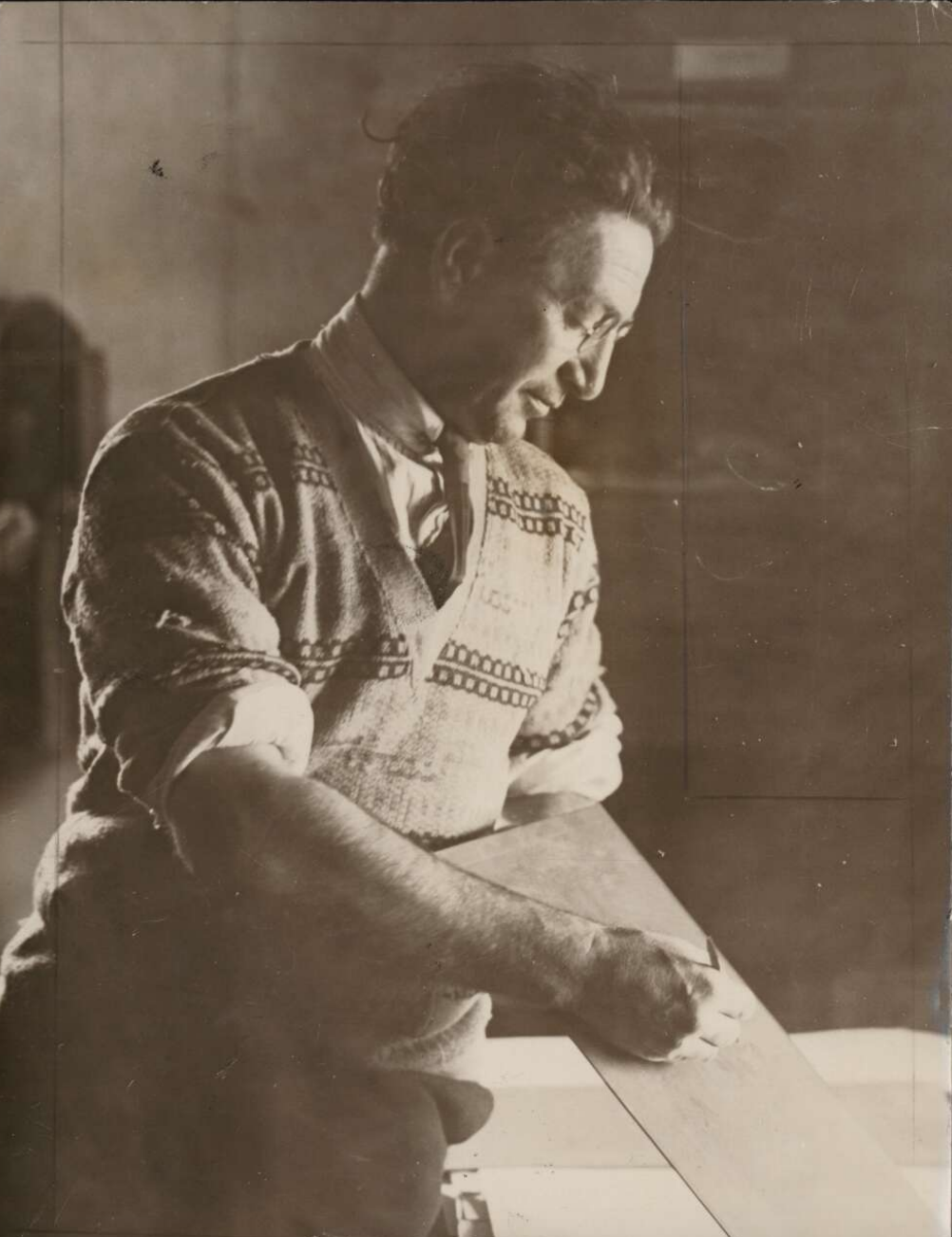
- Born: 11 February 1881; Lambeth, London, UK
- Died: 4 November 1929 (aged 48); Second Valley, South Australia
- Citizenship: Australian
- Occupations: Artist, printmaker

Henri Benedictus van Raalte (11 February 1881 – 4 November 1929), known as H. van Raalte, was an Australian artist and printmaker.

== Early life and training ==
Van Raalte was born in Lambeth, London in 1881 to a Dutch father, Joel van Raalte, a cigar merchant, and an English mother, Frances Elizabeth nee Cable. He was educated at the City of London School, the Royal Academy and later in Belgium and the Netherlands.

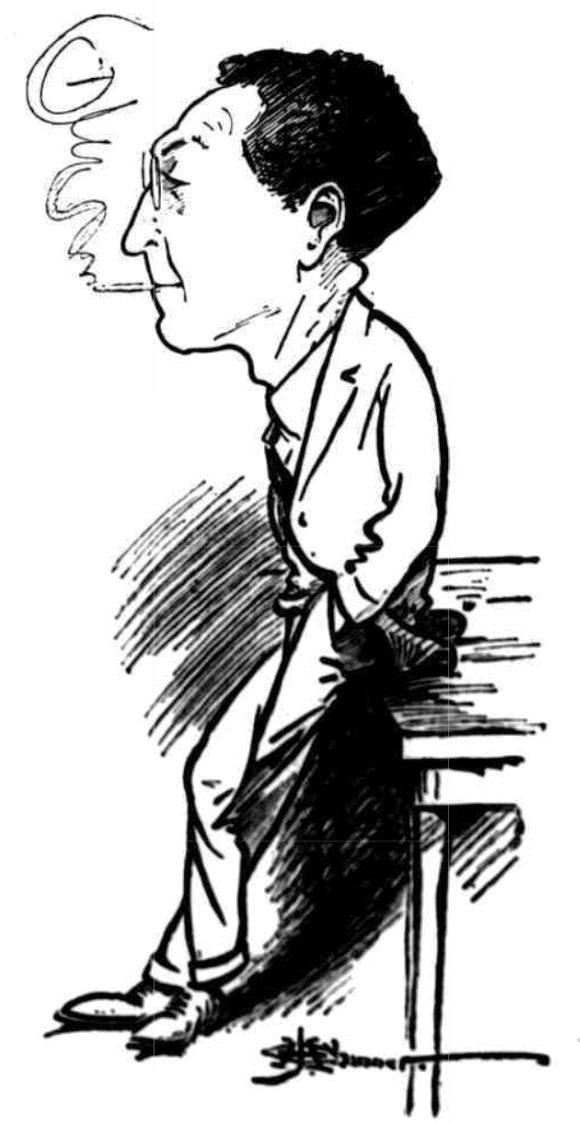
van Raalte, caricature by John Henry Chinner

He resigned in January 1926 after interference by Sir William Sowden, president of the Gallery's board, in the hanging of what Van Raalte considered "bad art". He was principle of the Perth School of Art, and was succeeded by Margaret Saunders.

== Death ==
He died on 4 November 1929. Van Raalte Place, in the Canberra suburb of Conder, is named in his honour.
