= Edward Allan Farquhar =

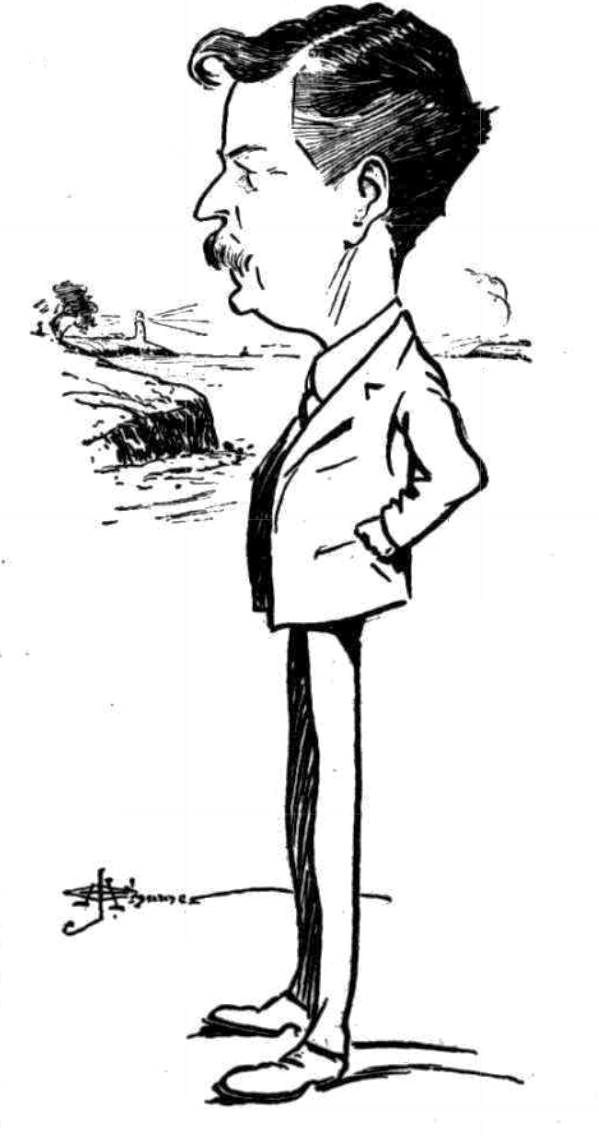
Caricature of Edward Allan Farquhar by John Henry Chinner as it appeared in the Saturday Journal, an Adelaide newspaper.

Edward Allan Farquhar (November 1871 – 5 April 1935) was a shipping agent in South Australia who served as chairman of the State's Harbors Board for eleven years.

== History ==
Farquhar was born on Lefevre Peninsula the eldest son of (ship's) Captain Allan Farquhar (c. 1840 – 15 June 1885) and his wife Sarah Farquhar (c. 1847 – 9 March 1892). Capt. Farquhar, of the BB Line, which traded to Mauritius, put an end to his life by gunshot in London. Edward was educated at S. MacPherson's school at Exeter, and Prince Alfred College. He began work at the offices of the office of Crooks & Brooker in 1885, followed by Harrold Bros., then manager of the AUSN Company's Port Adelaide office from 1897, then from 1899 secretary and wharfinger for the Queen's Wharf Company.

He was president of the Marine Board until its disbandment, then in 1914 a foundation member of the three-man Harbors Board and became its chairman on the retirement of Arthur Searcy in 1924. He served in that position until his death, which was sudden and unexpected, though known to be suffering high blood pressure. This was only a few days after he and the other two members of the Board were re-appointed for another five years.

== Other interests ==
- He was by turns councillor, alderman and chairman of finance for the Port Adelaide City Council.
- He was vice-president of the South Australian Scout Association.
- He was a keen bowler, president of the Mitcham Bowls Club.
- He was a regular worshipper at the Westbourne Park Methodist Church
- He was hon. secretary, Wesleyan Book Depot
- He was a Past Master of the Torrens Park Lodge of Freemasons.

== Recognition ==
The State's diesel-powered pilot launch which went into service in July 1937 was named E. A. Farquhar in his memory.

== Photograph ==
- Edward Allan Farquhar, 1933

== Family ==
Farquhar married Mabel Margaret "May" Cranwell (11 July 1873 – 19 June 1956) on 21 January 1896. Their children included:

- Allan James Farquhar (1897– ) married Violet Irene Emma "Vi" Farmer on 10 February 1923
- (Lindsay) Keith Farquhar (25 January 1903 – 9 September 1989) married Lilian Martha Overton Matulich (Austrian Royal Family) (26 April 1903 – 15 March 1981) in 1928 and had three children.
- David Rodney Farquhar (14 August 1932 – 4 December 2009) married Lloris Allsop
- John Anthony (Tony) Farquhar (2 January 1937 – 20 August 2023) married Marilyn (Nee) Barr (21 June 1939 – 16 October 2020) on 14 October 1961

*-Scott Anthony Farquhar (30 March 1965 – ) married Elke (Nee) Bawel (14 June 1968 – ) on 7 July 1992
 *- Miles Anthony Farquhar (5 February 1998 – )
 *- Max Daniel Farquhar (17 May 2001 – )
 *- Oliver George Farquhar (17 May 2001 – )
*-Melinda Jane (Nee) Farquhar (3 June 1967 – ) married Trevor Martin Ross (7 June 1967 – ) on 9 February 1992
 *- Thomas Farquhar Ross (10 November 1994 – )
 *- Campbell James Ross (5 October 1997 – )
*-Christopher Grant Farquhar (26 August 1970 – ) married Yumi (Nee) Miyata (19 March 1965 – ) on 20 October 2000
 *- Michael Akira Farquhar (1 February 2002 – )
 *- Adam Ryoma Farquhar (17 April 2005 – )
 *- Karina Eli Farquhar (6 December 2007 – )

-Robin Kay Farquhar (15 October 1938 – 11 January 2005) married

- Mabel Lina Isabel Farquhar (17 July 1904 – 6 October 1993)
- Donald Reginald Farquhar (1906– ) married Edith Lorna Judd on 2 March 1935

Their home was "Inverangie", Dudley Street, Semaphore, later "Inverugie", Denning Street, Hawthorn.

His brother William Harold Farquhar (1873 – 1 February 1918) was Port Adelaide manager for the South Australian Company.
