= Australian Christian Commonwealth =

- Type: weekly newspaper
- Editor: Joseph Berry (first edition); Rev. B. Wibberley 1901–1911; Rev. A. E. Cowley (final edition)
- Launched: 4 January 1901
- Ceased publication: 28 June 1940
- City: Adelaide
- Country: Australia
- ISSN: 2205-7552

The Australian Christian Commonwealth was a weekly newspaper published by Hussey & Gillingham in South Australia from 1901 to 1940.

== History ==
The Australian Christian Commonwealth was first published on 4 January 1901. Although "new", the masthead of the first edition included the subtitle "with which are incorporated The Christian Weekly & Methodist Journal, The Primitive Methodist Magazine, The Bible Christian Monthly" and that it was "The Organ of the Methodist Church in South Australia, and the Champion of Evangelical Christianity." The Methodist Church of Australasia had been formed by combining several Methodist denominations in Australia. The three incorporated titles belonged to the three South Australian branches of merging denominations :– Wesleyan Methodist Church, Primitive Methodist Church and Bible Christian Church.

The newspaper began as "Vol. XIII, No. 660, [New Series]" maintaining the publication order, alongside content and design continuity, of its previous iteration, the Christian Weekly and Methodist Journal. It continued publication until mid-1940, and was superseded by the South Australian Methodist (1940-1970).

Rev. Brian Wibberley Mus. Bac. was editor from 1901 to 1911.

== Preservation ==
The newspaper has been digitised and made available for free online by the National Library of Australia through the Australian Newspapers Digitisation Project.
