= Horwood Bagshaw =

Australian agricultural machinery manufacturer

Horwood Bagshaw Ltd. is an Australian agricultural machinery manufacturer and dealership chain whose origins date from the late 1800s.

== Horwood and Sons ==
Joel Horwood (c. 1800 – 18 May 1864) was a mechanical engineer from Oldham, England, who arrived in Adelaide, South Australia on the Baboo in 1848 and the following year founded the Colonial Iron Works in Hindley Street, Adelaide. At least three of his four sons were educated at John Lorenzo Young's Adelaide Educational Institution; all followed in the same line of business, initially with him, then in different parts of Australia. As Horwood and Son, then Horwood & Sons, he was able to supply the burgeoning mining industry with urgently required parts, some of substantial size. With his death and changes in ownership, it became successively Horwood, Ellis & Stevens, Horwood & Ellis in 1866 then Ellis & Chittleborough in 1868. That firm failed and the business was taken over by James A Whitfield in 1869. Informative accounts of Adelaide's iron foundries and heavy engineering workshops of the period may be found here.

Joel Horwood (1832 – 4 May 1900)

In 1856 his eldest son, also named Joel Horwood, opened a branch of Horwood & Sons in Vine Street, Bendigo (then called Sandhurst). He was a successful breeder of Shorthorn cattle and Cleveland and Clydesdale horses at his property "Bridgewater Park" on the River Loddon. He had significant interests in the United Garden Gully Gold Mining Company.

He married Emma Mary Kentish (c. 1835 – 8 June 1874) on 30 March 1854; their daughter Bertha Ellen Horwood (20 December 1854 – ) married James Garden Ramsay (1827–1890). Other children were Henry Joel Horwood, Bertha Ellen Ramsay, Charles Kentish Horwood, Albert Frederick Horwood, Emma Adelaide Horwood, Frank Butler Horwood, Norman Coverdale Horwood, Stanley Coverdale Horwood, Ivy Estelle Horwood and Edward James Horwood.

He died on 4 May 1900 aged 70 at his home "Glendure House" on Myrtle Street, Bendigo, survived by his second wife Rachelle, née Sibree (born 1868 – her mother was a Coverdale). The foundry was taken over by the foreman Frank M. Brown in 1902 Joel (jnr)'s son Edward James Horwood was notable in Broken Hill as manager of BHP's mine works. He married Carrie, youngest daughter of Gilbert Wood on 9 April 1890.

Thomas Horwood (c. 1840 – 12 August 1898)

Joel Horwood's second son, Thomas Horwood, ran a Horwood and Son foundry at Wallaroo, ownership of which was taken over in 1869 by T. R. Heath. He continued to manage the business, then moved to Bendigo.

John William Horwood (c. 1845 – 23 September 1915)

His fourth son, John William Horwood, returned to England in 1865 to study engineering and subsequently purchased the Albion Foundry in Castlemaine, Victoria. A daughter, Olive Adele Horwood, in 1901 married Harry Lawson, later a Premier of Victoria.

== J. H. Horwood and Co. ==
His third son, Joseph Henry Horwood (1841 – 17 April 1913) worked at the Bendigo Iron Works constructing mining equipment. He returned to Adelaide in 1867 to supply the Montacute goldmine with a ten head stamp battery, which he bought back the following year and installed at the Echunga goldmine. He then spent some time with his mining engineer brother John William Horwood in Castlemaine, Victoria before returning to Adelaide in 1872. He built a crushing plant in the Barossa Valley, then moved to Moonta to work on the copper mines, but withdrew in 1874 after being singled out for retribution for his part in suppressing the miners' strike. On 18 March 1875 he married Maria Brooks, and in the same year started work for Francis Clark & Sons, managing their machinery dealership on Grenfell Street then Blyth Street which they sold in 1882. He took over Strapps' foundry in Currie Street, then, with Samuel Strapps (c. 1840–1913), founded a machinery manufacturing and sales business in Currie Street, bringing foreman Thomas Ward with him. Horwood's specialty was well-drilling and he built the first steam-powered rock drilling machine, as well as being a pioneer in tube-lined bores. His fence-wire tensioning device and windmills won several prizes at the Royal Agricultural and Horticultural Society shows. The business moved to Franklin Street in 1906 and became J. H. Horwood and Co. Ltd. in 1912.

Joseph was a member of the Adelaide City Mission and the Flinders Street Baptist Church.

== Horwood Bagshaw Ltd. ==
Joseph Henry's son, Horace R. Horwood (1885?–) was apprenticed to his father's company in 1903, and on completion became a salesman, selling farm machinery from the new Currie Street showrooms. In 1924, after acquiring J. S. Bagshaw & Sons Ltd, he was appointed General Sales Manager and director in the firm newly formed Horwood Bagshaw Ltd and retired in 1953.

Around 1960 the company acquired David Shearer Ltd of Mannum.

== Bibliography ==
Horwood Bagshaw : 125 years progress, 1838–1963 Horwood Bagshaw Ltd, Adelaide, 1963
