= William Thomas Shapley =

Australian Bible Christian minister (1864–1956)

Reverend William Thomas Shapley
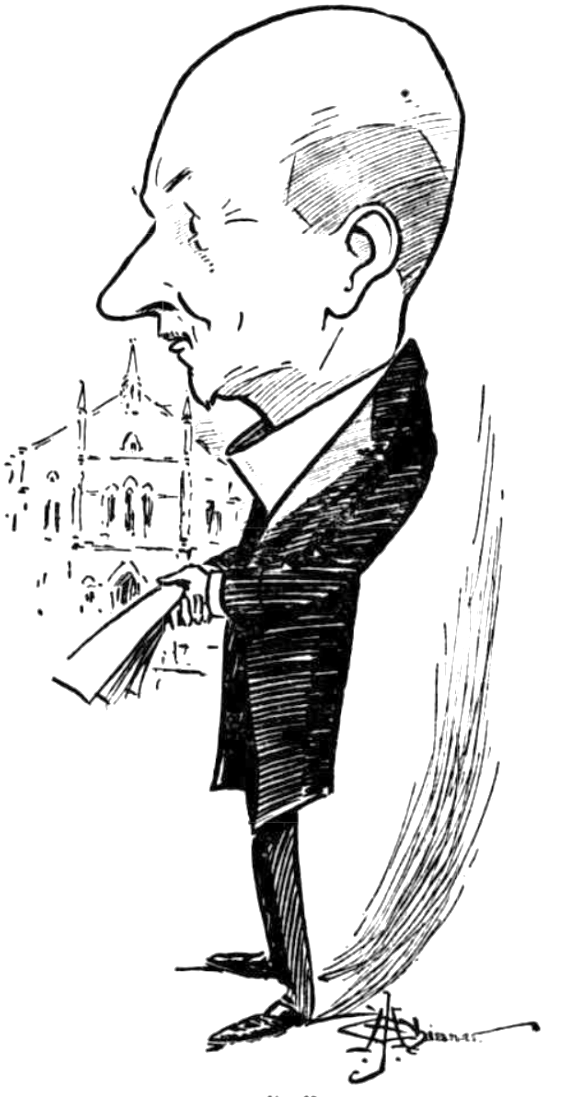
- Caricature from "Notable Citizens" series by John Henry Chinner appearing in "Saturday Journal" 1920–1925
- Born: 17 May 1864; Bedminster, Bristol, England
- Died: 10 May 1956 (aged 91); Kingswood, South Australia, Australia
- Occupation: Bible Christian minister

Rev. William Thomas Shapley (17 May 1864 – 10 May 1956) was an Australian Bible Christian minister.

== History ==
Shapley was born in Bedminster, Bristol and entered the Methodist ministry in 1889. He served in a number of circuits until his transfer to the South Australian Methodist Conference in 1901.

During the First World War, Shapley was pastor of the Jamestown Methodist Church in South Australia. The region was dominated by German Lutherans, whom Shapley considered amiable. He preached that:

We need 'to play the men' towards our fellow German colonists; let us guard well our feelings, our patriotism must not be mingled with bitterness and weakened by revenge. We shall do well to remember that they have laboured with us to develop these fair lands, they have proven themselves loyal and noble citizens of our Commonwealth, their blood is mingled with ours. Let us beware lest the sword of justice should be forged in the fires of hate into a dagger of malice.

Shapley was chairman of the Christian Union. He was president of the South Australian Methodist Conference from 1923 to 1924.

Shapley died on 10 May 1956 in Kingswood, a suburb of Adelaide, South Australia. A thanksgiving tribute service was held at Pirie Street Methodist Church in Adelaide on 14 May 1956, delivered by the Hon. Sir Shirley Jeffries.

== Works ==
- Shapley, W. T. (1936). The origin and growth of Methodism in South Australia : a series of articles – via National Library of Australia.
- Shapley, W. T. (1952). Our bible christian heritage – via National Library of Australia.
