= Charles Bastard =

Australian swimming coach and businessman

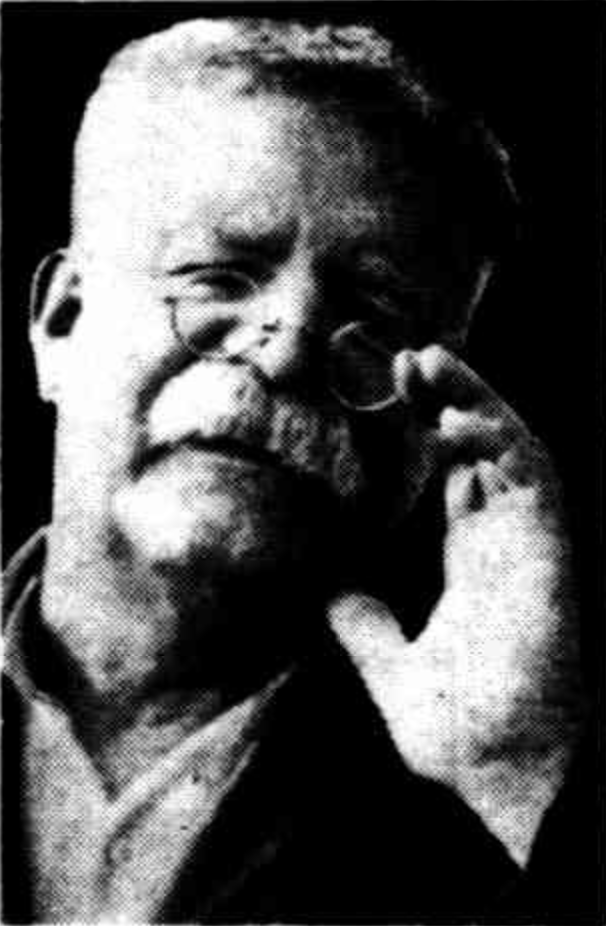
- Born: 4 February 1863; Adelaide
- Died: 1941 (aged 77–78)
- Occupation: Swimming instructor

Robert Charles Bastard (4 February 1863 – 6 November 1941) was an Australian swimming teacher who succeeded his father Thomas Barnabas Bastard as lessee of Adelaide's "City Baths". When the council upgraded the facility to include the city's only Olympic-size swimming pool, Bastard was retained as a supervisor.

== History ==
Charles Bastard first came to public notice in 1869, when he was already a strong swimmer in various styles, and to amuse patrons of the City Baths would perform aquatic feats such as retrieving a shilling coin thrown into the deepest part of the pool. After leaving school, Charles Bastard worked for two years in an architect's office before studying chemistry, but he eventually decided to manage the city baths.

On the death of their father, Charles and his brother Philip Stewart (Stuart?) Bastard, later known as Philip Stuart (1853–1920) inherited the lease of the City Baths. In 1885 Charles bought out his brother and took charge of the Baths.

Bastard was inspired to teach swimming from his boyhood days in Adelaide, when he tried but was unsuccessful in rescuing a boy from drowning in the Torrens River. Over the years he was called upon numerous times to assist with rescuing and recovering drowning victims from the Torrens River.

In 1886 he was employed by the South Australian Commissioner of Police to provide practical instructions to the Police Force "restoring the apparently drowned".

In 1895, Bastard began to offer a Bush Biscuit to every boy who recorded their name at the City Bath and also passed a swimming test. In 1925, over 500 Bush Biscuits were awarded to boys in one season.

It was estimated that he taught over 14,000 people to swim.

He died at the Wakefield Street Hospital and his remains interred with those of his mother, at the West Terrace Cemetery.

== The Adelaide City Baths ==
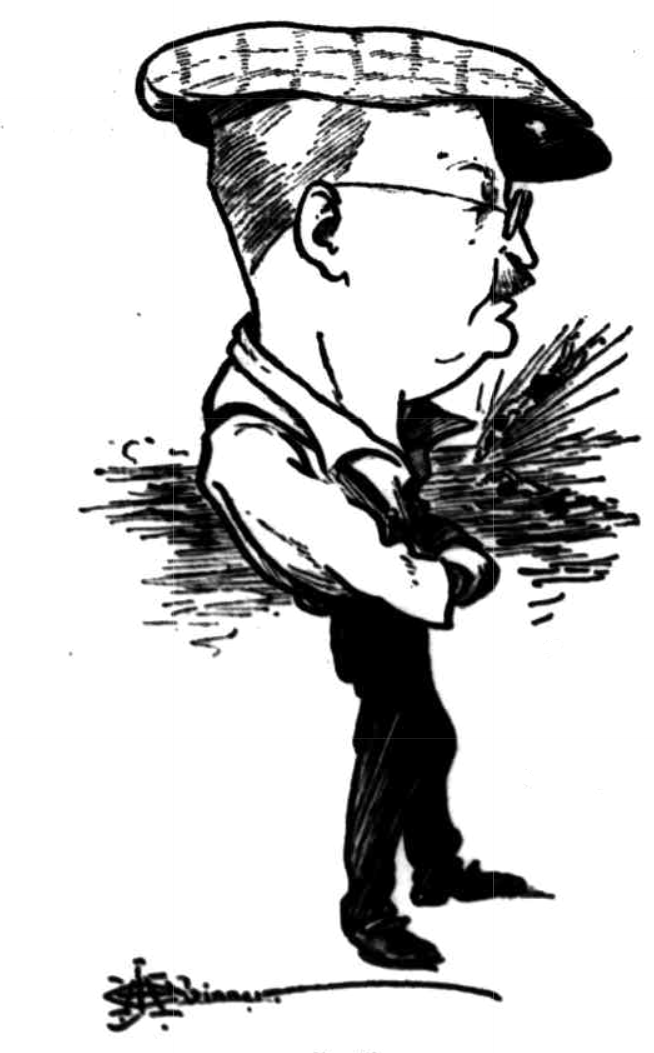
Charles Bastard by J. H. Chinner

The original City Baths (1863–1913), on King William Road below Parliament House, was erected by the Adelaide City Council, and its first manager ("Keeper of the Baths") was a council employee, John Cox, previously Overseer of Works, and was operated by the Council as no tenders were received for its lease, due to the cost of water. After a three year delay a seven-year lease of the property was put up for tender, and Thomas Bastard was the successful applicant, and renewed it another two times before he died.

The first pool was 75 by 25 feet (22.9 by 7.6 m), depth 6 and 3 feet (1.83 and 0.91 m) at the two ends. It was open to men and boys only; no bathers were worn, and admission was 3d. (three pence, perhaps $2 in today's values). It was rebuilt in 1883 and reopened a few months after Thomas Bastard's death. The new facility had two pools — the large pool 100 by 30 feet (30.5 by 9.1 m) and 7 feet (2.1 m) at the deep end, another 40 by 30 feet (12.2 by 9.1 m) and 3 or 4 feet (0.91 or 1.22 m) deep for instruction purposes.

In May 1887 he converted the pool to a (roller) skating rink for the colder months when patronage by swimmers was at a minimum. The floor of 117 by 35.5 feet (35.7 m × 10.8 m) was entirely of jarrah planks, supported on jarrah posts and beams.

The Baths had a major makeover in 1910, with viewing platforms and showers installed and walls tiled. Women had been admitted for years, but until Annette Kellerman made bathing fashionable there were few female patrons. (Note: Bastard later claimed some share in Kellerman's success.)

That was, in turn, replaced in 1940, built to Olympic standards, with a separate diving pool and tiered stands for spectators. The City Baths was totally demolished in 1972 to make way for the Festival Centre.

In 1888 Bastard took over management of the Columbia Rink in Calcutta for the firm of Ridgley & Raymond, leaving longtime employee Fred Needham in charge.

Bastard was appointed caretaker and foreman of the new Baths.

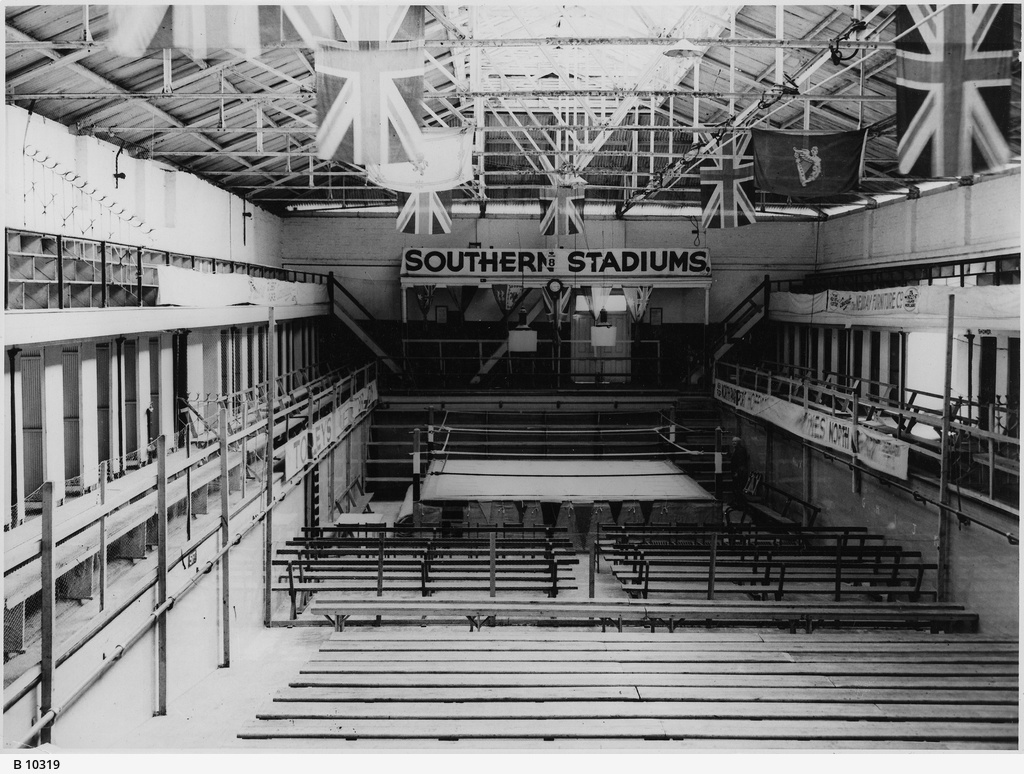
City Baths in Adelaide 1938, drained to host a wrestling competition

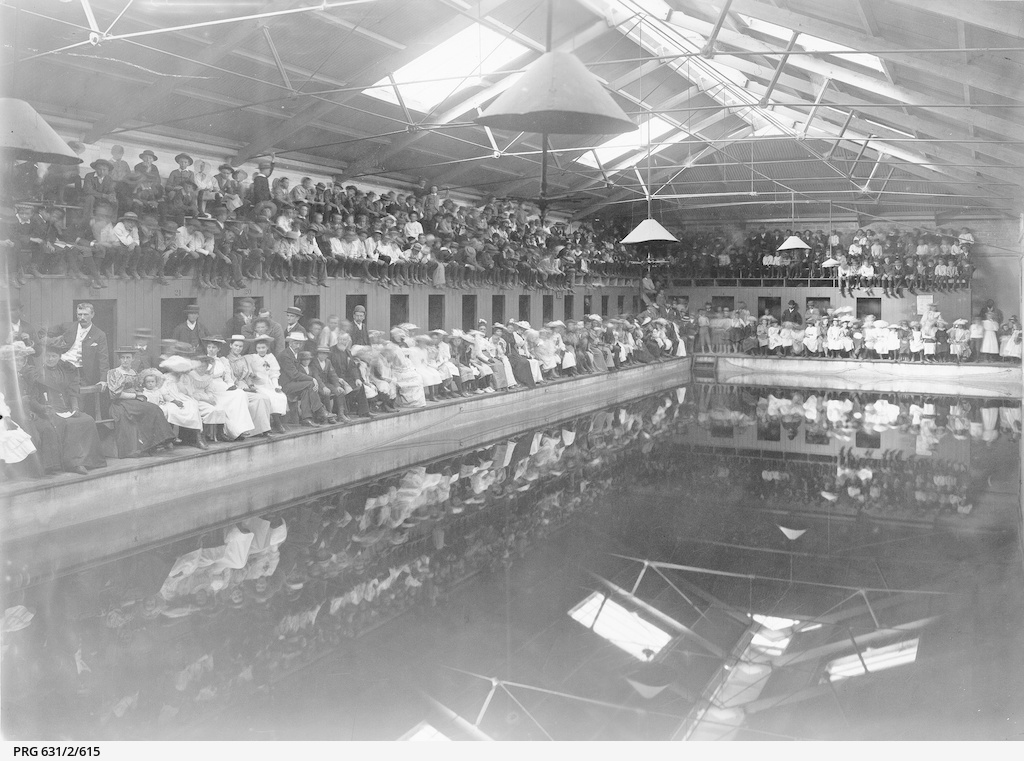
View of the City Baths during a swimming contest about 1896

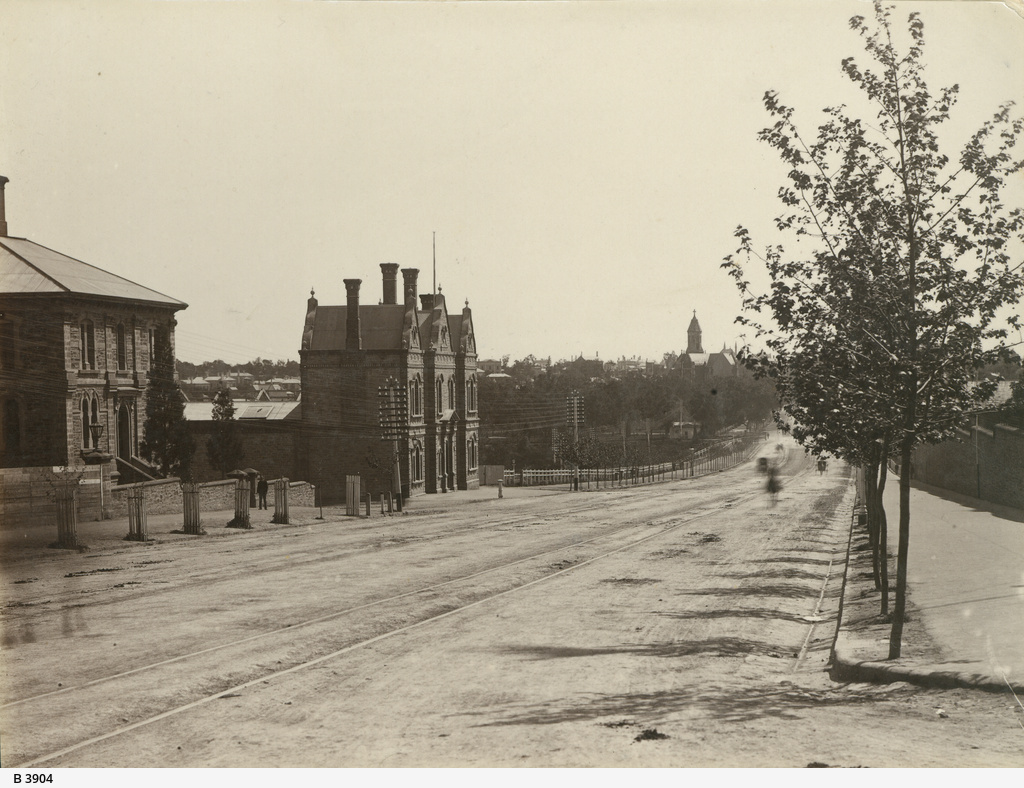
City Baths, King William Road, approx 1890.

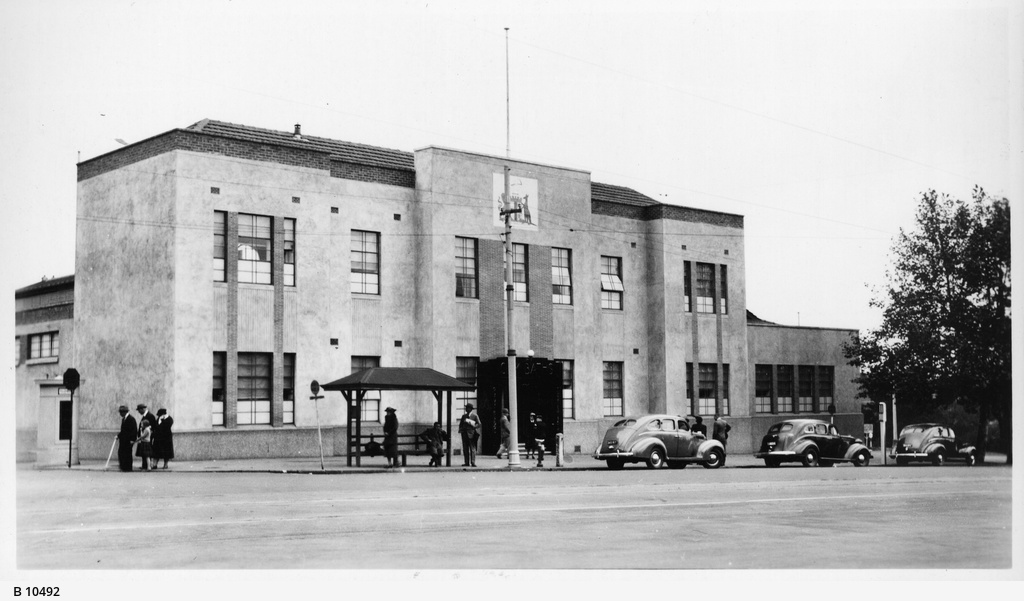
Adelaide City Baths after being rebuilt in 1941.

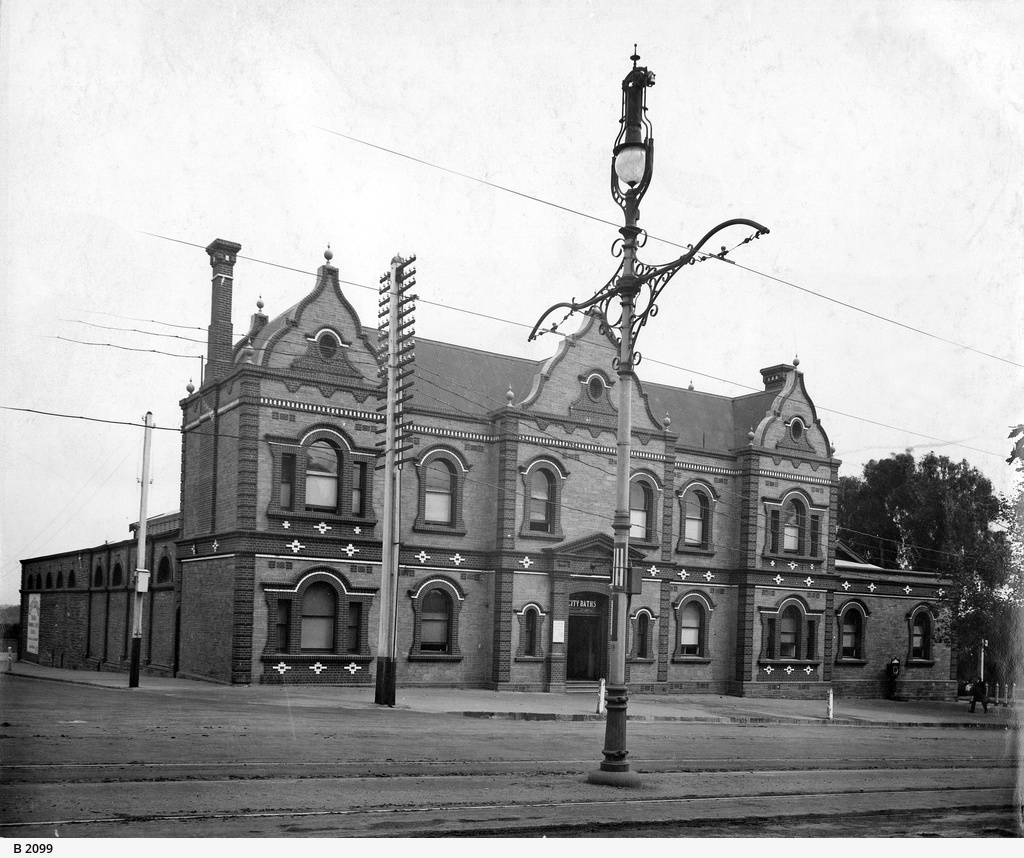
The City baths with its Dutch gables about 1890.

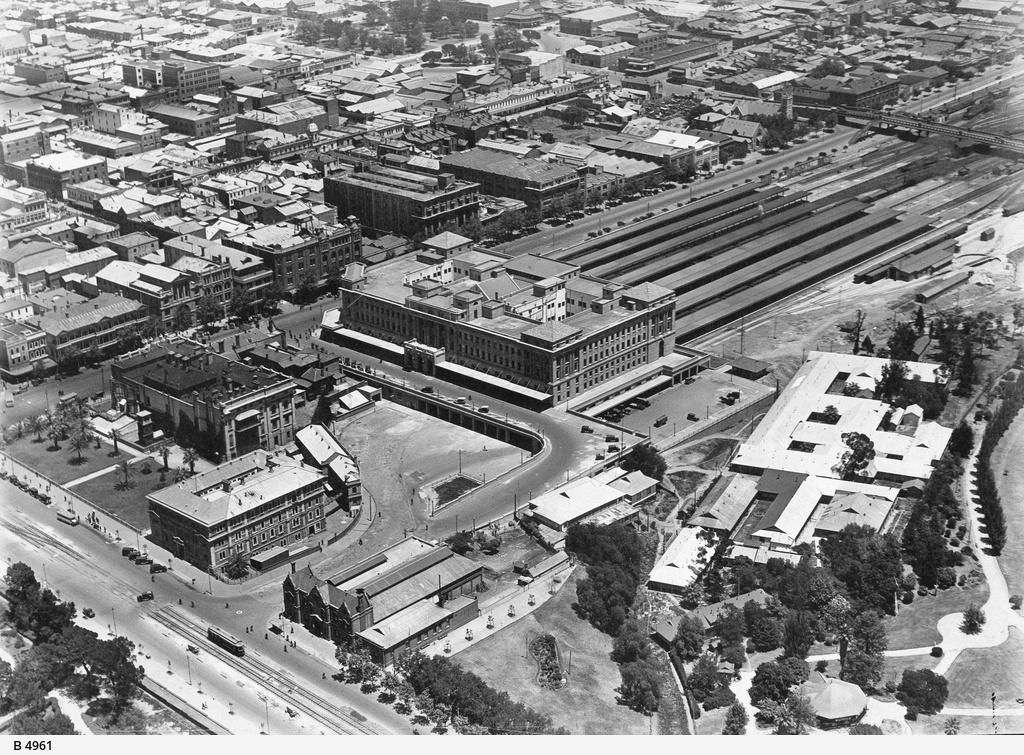
Aerial view of part of Adelaide near the Railway Station 1929. The old City Baths is in the foreground, opposite the tram on King William Road. The building between the baths and Parliament House is the Government Printing Office.

== Personal ==
Bastard was a non-smoker and teetotal. He ate sparingly, of simple foods. Every morning he exercised for ten minutes with dumbbells then took a swimming class before breakfast.

== Recognition ==
Bastard was universally honored for his devotion to teaching.. A plaque reading

"To commemorate the services rendered by the late Charles Bastard, lessee of the City Baths 1885-1939, who taught over 10,000 people to swim"

was installed at the City Baths shortly after his death.

== Family ==
=== Thomas Barnabas Bastard ===
Charles Bastard's parents, Thomas Barnabas Bastard (died 10 September 1883) and Elizabeth Lucy Bastard (c 1821 – 23 August 1877) immigrated to South Australia by the William Stuart in 1852, and in later years founded the Old Colonists' Association. Also on board was their son John Bastard (22 October 1843 – 17 June 1908), who would become posts and telegraph master at Port Adelaide, and several other children, including one born on voyage.

Thomas Bastard was a bootmaker by trade, and was taught to swim by Captain Beckwith, father of Fred Beckwith (1821–1898). He applied his knowledge in teaching other colonists at what passed in those days for a bathing pool — a fenced-off section of the River Torrens, upstream from what is now the Morphett Street bridge.

In February 1863 Thomas Bastard made a failed attempt to form a swimming club, but was more successful a year later, electing to serve as hon. treasurer of the South Australian Swimming Club, which he filled with conspicuous success until his death in 1883, while J. Kemp Penney took the role of secretary. Anthony Forster, MLC, whose son Anthony Yarwood Forster (1849–1874) was a fine swimmer, was offered the post of president. Thomas Charles Bastard acted as secretary 1881 to 1909.

=== Philip Stewart Bastard ===
Charles' brother, Philip was a champion swimmer who from 1877 managed the Baths for his father. He left Australia in 1880 for New Zealand and was later in Denver City, Colorado, where he had the misfortune to be mistaken for a wanted criminal and arrested. He may be the same person as Philip Stuart Bastard, who in 1873 became a mounted trooper in the Northern Territory, and as Philip Stuart was licensee of the Queensland Hotel, Bourke Street, Melbourne, died in Coogee, New South Wales, in November 1920.

Thomas Barnabas Bastard ( – 10 September 1883) married Elizabeth Lucy ?? (c 1821 – 23 August 1877). Their children include:

- Elizabeth Lucy Bastard (1841 – 5 February 1919) married O'Shannon
- John Bastard (22 October 1843 – 17 June 1908) married Elizabeth Dench on 24 May 1864. Their grandson Frederick John Bastard changed his surname to Baxter.
- Mary Ann Bastard (11 September 1845 – 14 August 1930)
- Martha Bastard (15 July 1847 – 5 June 1926) married Henry Langberg in 1871
- Thomas George Bastard (March 1850 – 14 December 1918)
- Philip Stewart Bastard (4 June 1853 (Note: Born on board William Stewart) – 7 November 1920)
- Robert Charles Bastard (4 February 1863 – 6 November 1941)

- Frederick Charles Bastard (24 December 1884 – )
- Ethel Emily Bastard (20 June 1887 – )
- Winnifred Isabel Bastard (1890– )
- Stanley Robert Bastard (1892– )

- Emma Bastard (10 August 1867 – 25 February 1948) married Albert Edward Eardley in 1888
