= Arthur William Piper =

Australian judge (1865–1936)

Arthur William Piper (5 July 1865 – 19 February 1936) was a judge of the Supreme Court of South Australia

== History ==
Piper was born at Faversham, Hertfordshlre, a son of the (Bible Christian) Rev. Thomas Piper, who arrived with his family from Exeter to South Australia aboard Collingrove in January 1870. He was educated at South Australian public schools, then won an exhibition to study at Prince Alfred College. He was admitted to the bar at age 21, in July 1886. He became a partner in 1892 in the legal firm of Bakewell, Stow, and Piper, of which he later became head. Two of his sons, H. B. and F. E. Piper, were admitted as members of the firm. He was made a King's Counsel in 1911 on the silver jubilee of his career as a barrister. He was in partnership with some of South Australia's most prominent lawyers: Sir Josiah Symon, P. R. Stow and Leonard William Bakewell with whom he was associated as Symon, Bakewell, Stow and Piper. Symon dropped out; Bakewell retired In 1920, and around 1922 left to open a practice of his own. William K. Bakewell took over his father's share of the business, and Piper's sons H. B. and F. E. Piper, were brought into the firm as Piper, Bakewell, and Piper. On 16 June 1927, he succeeded Mr. Justice Poole on the Supreme Court bench. He served as president of the Law Society of South Australia for a total of five years, his second appointment being in the year before he died.

He died five months after an operation at Memorial Hospital. His remains were interred at the Mitcham Cemetery. His successor on the bench was Edward Erskine Cleland, K.C.

== Other interests ==
- He was a founding member of the Norwood Bowls Club, but gave up the game when he moved out of the district.
- He was chairman of the committee that established the Norwood Oval
- He was an active member of the Royal Geographical Society, the Liberal Union, then the Liberal Federation, South Australian Literary Societies' Union, and the River Murray League and served as President or Vice-President of each.
- He was for many years patron of the Norwood Football Club
- He was a prominent Freemason.
- He was a candidate for the Assembly seat of Torrens in 1910 but lost in a general move to Labor.

== Family ==
Arthur William Piper (5 July 1865 – 19 February 1936) married Edna Elizabeth Counter ( – 24 June 1938) in 1889

- Alfred Lancelot "Lance" Piper (1891 – 18 August 1935) noted for his association with the Cheer-Up Society.
- Dorothy Piper (1892–1965)
- Harold Bayard Piper (1894 – 10 May 1953) Adelaide barrister member of the legal firm of Piper, Bakewell, and Piper, in 1938 appointed a Judge of the Commonwealth Court of Conciliation and Arbitration and served as Chief Judge from 1941 to 1947. Piper married Dorothy Edna Smith (28 June 1892 – ) on 7 June 1922. She was the eldest daughter of Stow Smith.
- (Florence) Edith Piper (1896–1956)
- Roderick Arthur Piper (1898– ) in Western Australia
- Francis Ernest Piper (1900–1959) member of the legal firm of Piper, Bakewell, and Piper
- Dr. Cyril Thomas Piper (1902–1961) married Olive Mary Lillecrapp in 1928, lived in Bute, South Australia
- John Counter Piper (1904–1992) married Llywella Alice Davies on 15 March 1930, lived in Adelaide

They had a home at 91 Wattle street, Fullarton
