= Ernest Pringle Ramsay =

Western Australian Deputy Postmaster-General

Ernest Pringle Ramsay (c. August 1870 – 30 July 1952) was deputy director of Posts and Telegraphs (or Deputy Postmaster-General) for Western Australia 1925–1927 and for South Australia, 1927–1935. (Note: The Postmaster-General was a Commonwealth Government Cabinet position, to whom six Commonwealth public servants, as Deputies, reported; one to each State. They were each responsible for postal, telegraphic and telephone services within that State.)

== History ==
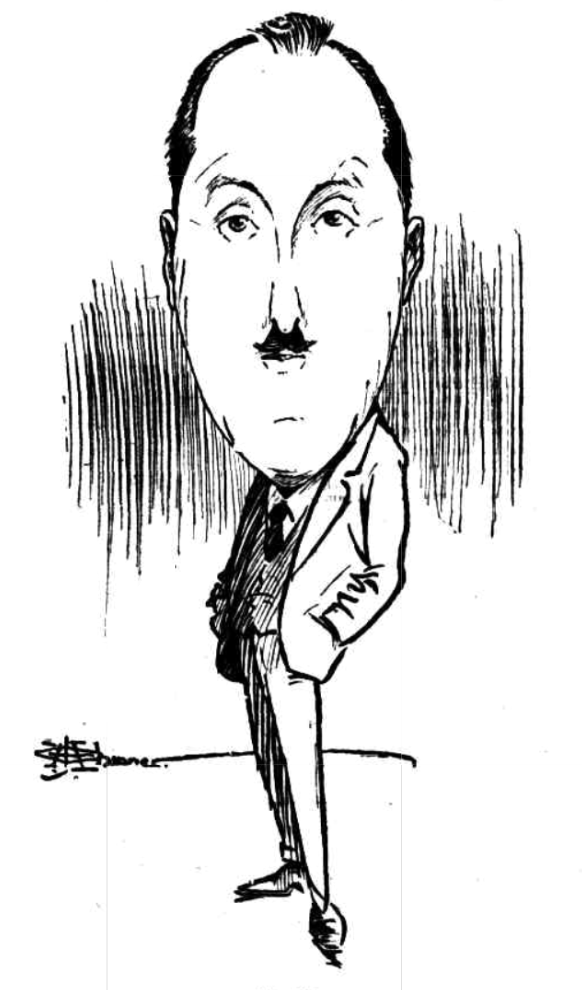
caricature by J. H. Chinner

Ramsay was born in Maitland, New South Wales to postman Charles Ramsay (died 1872) and Rosanna Ramsay (died 1893), both Scots-born, and Ramsay was unmistakably proud of his Scottish ancestry. He was educated at Maitland High School for Boys, having won a scholarship which entitled him to three years' free tuition, then started his 56-year career in 1884 as a telegram messenger-boy at Maitland post-office. In 1889 he was appointed telegraph operator at West Maitland, then became a clerk and in due course was promoted to inspector, then assistant superintendent in the Mails Branch in Melbourne.

He succeeded J. J. Lloyd as deputy director of Posts and Telegraphs in Western Australia in 1925, then in late 1927 took over from James Mason in a similar position in South Australia. Mason had been due to retire on 30 June 1927, but had been incapacitated following an attempt on his life the previous December. Ramsay was a believer in travelling around the State to experience first-hand the problems and conditions experienced in the great diversity of workplaces under his control. In Western Australia he logged 12,000 miles (19,000 km) in two years, overseeing that vast state, and more than 4,000 miles in his first year in South Australia. He was a staunch defender of the Australian Postal Institute, a social, cultural and sporting club with hundreds of regional branches, to which all employees of the various arms of the PMG's Department belonged.

With the advent of World War II he voluntarily came out of retirement to work as a telegraphist in the Adelaide GPO, and finally left the service in 1946.

On 23 December 1940, Mrs Ramsay fell to the floor on leaving the lounge of the Oriental Hotel, and broke her pelvis. Ramsay sued H. R. Walsh, the licensee, for negligence. The first hearing was on 6 March 1942; Walsh, in his defence, claimed Mrs Ramsay was a regular patron, and had never complained about safety. The hearing was to have resumed at a future date, but was never held, as she died the following day.

Ramsay died at his home, 2 Loch street, St. Peters, and cremated in a private ceremony.

== Publications ==
- Ramsay, Ernest Pringle; S.A. Postal Institute Lecture Society (1934), The history of the Post Office in S. A since the foundation of the colony 1838 : delivered Tuesday May 8 1934, S.A. Postal Institute Lecture Society Copy held in Mountford Collection, SLSA

== Family ==
Ramsay married Agnes Esther (Note: Mrs Ramsay's middle name has been variously given as Francis, Frances, Esther and Ester) "Nessie" Hay (1881 – 7 March 1942), daughter of Thomas Diglick Hay (died 14 December 1939) and Margaret Burns Hay of Lambton, New South Wales. Their family included

- Mavis Hay Ramsay (24 August 1907 – ) of 2 Loch Street, St Peters, South Australia was a trained singer.
- F/Lt Rodney Pringle "Rod" Ramsay DFC (31 January 1911 – 21 October 1979) married Nancy "Nan" Watts. He was with Commonwealth Bank, Adelaide, then Wagga Wagga, before enlisting with RAAF. Later Bowral, and St Peters.
- Ailsa Mary Ramsay (13 March 1913 – ) married in Japan Capt. Harry Scheiner (born 1903), lived in Virginia, US; later Florida. Her sister Mavis visited her in America several times. Both women featured regularly in the newspaper social pages.

They lived at Trevorten Avenue, Glenunga in 1932, 9 Woodfield Avenue, Fullarton in 1942, later 2 Loch street, St Peters
