= Patrick Vincent Duffy =

Irish artist (1832–1909)

- Portrait by Margaret Saunders
- Born: 1832; Dublin, Ireland
- Died: 22 November 1909 (aged 76–77); Dublin
- Occupation: Painter

Patrick Vincent Duffy (1832 – 22 November 1909) was an Irish painter, primarily of landscapes.

== Life ==
River by Duffy undated

Born on Nassau Street, Dublin, Duffy was christened "Patrick" on 4 March 1832. His middle name "Vincent" was taken at confirmation and he used it thereafter. He was the son of a silversmith and jeweller, James and his wife Mary Anne Duffy (née Lamb). Duffy received his art education in the school of the Royal Dublin Society school of landscape and ornament beginning in 1847. The family home, from which Duffy worked as a young man, was 19 Cullenswood, Ranelagh.

He began to exhibit at the Royal Hibernian Academy (RHA) in 1851 and became an Associate member on 18 April 1860. He became a full member just a few months later and would be appointed Keeper of the RHA in 1870, living at Academy House, Abbey Street. Duffy held this post for 38 years, doubling as the Treasurer during the last few years of his life. Almost all of his paintings were restricted to landscapes, though he did some sculpture, exhibiting a model of the Cross at Monasterboice in 1854. His landscapes included the coast around Dublin, Killarney, Connemara, and Wicklow. Over his life, he exhibited more than 400 paintings with the RHA. Some of his work, such as A Wicklow common, now in the National Gallery of Ireland, show the influence of impressionism.

His work was featured in numerous exhibitions including Dublin International Exhibition of Arts and Manufactures of 1865, the Irish Exhibition of Arts and Manufactures in 1882, the Irish International Exhibition of 1907, the Cork Industrial Exhibition in 1885, and the Munster–Connacht Exhibition in Limerick in 1906.

Following a long illness, he died on 22 November 1909 in Richmond Hospital, Dublin. He was survived by his wife, Elizabeth (née Malone), and a daughter.

Some of his works are held in the Hugh Lane Gallery. A portrait of Duffy by Jack B. Yeats is held in the Smithsonian National Portrait Gallery.
