= Harold Edward Winterbottom =

Australian business executive

Harold Edward Winterbottom (1879 – 16 October 1953) was secretary of the South Australian Chamber of Manufactures 1907–1947 and organiser of various major public functions in Adelaide, South Australia.

== History ==
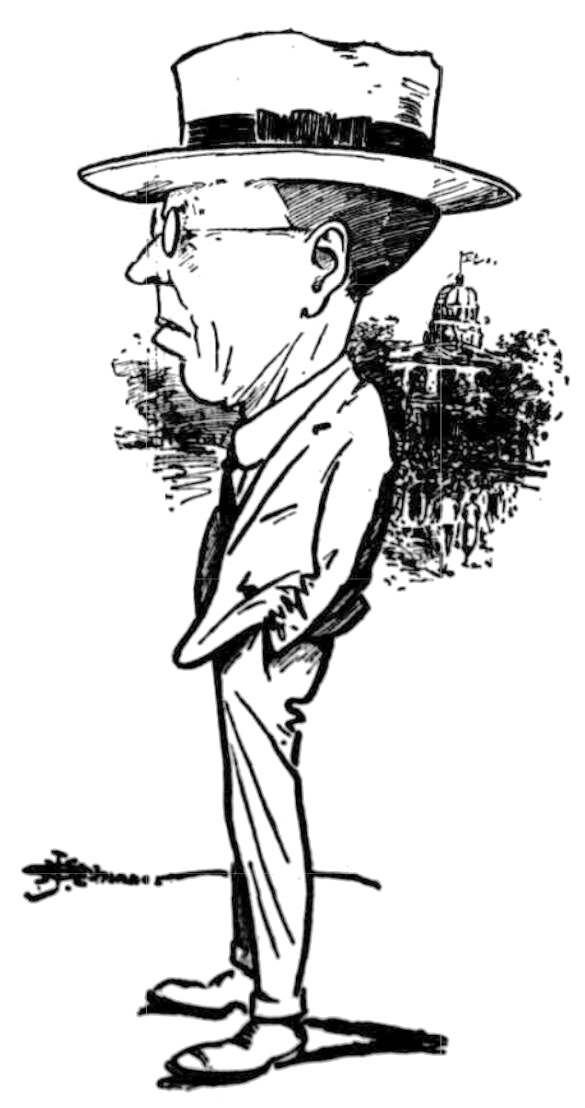
caricature by J. H. Chinner

Winterbottom was born in London, second son of Charles John Winterbottom (c. 1847 – 18 February 1890), who, as accountant for the English & Australian Copper Company of Port Adelaide, emigrated with his wife Jane Winterbottom, née Firkins and small family to South Australia on the RMS Iberia in 1888 and had a home on the Esplanade, Semaphore.

C. J. Winterbottom was instrumental in the sacking of H. Trewenack, the manager of E & A Copper in 1889 and was subsequently appointed joint manager with metallurgist John Dunstan.

After her husband's death Mrs Winterbottom ran a boarding house at two historic residences: "Bute House" at 176–186 Military Road, Semaphore, followed in 1896 by "Airlie", 9 Trinity Street, College Town, owned by Edward Kay, but by 1897 she was looking for other premises. No further trace of her has been found.

Nothing has been found of his schooling and little of his early days in the colony: he served an apprenticeship under G. F. Cleland, and J. H. Thompson was revealed as a childhood friend; he was a member of the Adelaide Rowing Club c. 1905 and a Lacrosse player; from 1909 secretary of the Association.

He has been cited as organiser of the Royal Adelaide Show for six years from c. 1900, an assertion which is difficult to verify.

=== Chamber of Manufactures ===
He first came to prominence in 1908, (Note: Winterbottom was appointed secretary early in 1908 to succeed P. H. Evans, who resigned in October 1907.) as the very active and astute secretary of the South Australian Chamber of Manufactures (Inc.) when they proposed a "Manufacturers' Day" to be held on 8 September during the coming Royal Show. The promotion, where shopkeepers displayed only Australian-manufactured goods in their windows was successful, and repeated the following year.

He organised a highly successful Manufacturers' Exhibition held at the Jubilee Exhibition Building in April–May 1910, in conjunction with which an extensive musical competition was organised by W. A. Cawthorne. Winterbottom was praised for his handling of a major hitch — the forced postponement of the opening night fireworks display.

=== Patriotic and benevolent causes ===
The Lord Mayor's Patriotic Fund, for alleviating distress to families of servicemen, was inaugurated in August 1914, with the mayor (A. A. Simpson) as chairman and Winterbottom as hon. secretary. It was one of a great number of organisations with similar objectives, leading to much duplication of effort and uneven distribution of benefits. A year later its management committee merged with that of the South Australian Soldiers' Fund, so effectively became one entity of which Winterbottom was secretary until 1937.

In 1922 he sued printers Vardon & Sons and Verge Cyril Blunden for publishing a defamatory article Heartless Treatment of Soldiers' Widows in the Diggers' Gazette of 19 November 1921, for which he was awarded £1,000 without costs, plus written and published apologies.

=== Other interests ===
He was secretary of Winemakers' Association of SA, and in April 1945 succeeded Charles Stanley Panton (father of Selkirk Panton) of Victoria as secretary of the Federal Viticultural Council. Two years later the office was transferred to Sydney and he was replaced by K. M. F. Powell.

His remains were interred at the Centennial Park Cemetery.

== Family ==
Winterbottom married Alice Francis in 1908. Their family included:

- H(arold) Denis Winterbottom (8 October 1910 – 2001) took over from his father as general secretary of the Chamber of Manufactures.
- Ruth Alice Winterbottom (24 June 1912 – )
- Barbara Joyce Winterbottom (1913– )
- Janet Winterbottom (23 March 1921– ) married John Adams on 21 June 1941

They had a home at 29 Park Terrace (today's Greenhill Road), Eastwood.

His elder brother, Douglas Charles Winterbottom, married Ethel "Elsie" Francis on 30 July 1903. Both wives were daughters of Walter James Francis of Norwood. He was a chemist with the Wheat Harvest Board and the Victorian Wheat Commission in charge of weevil suppression, then from 1922 with John Darling & Son in Melbourne.
