= Edward Julius =

Australian forester

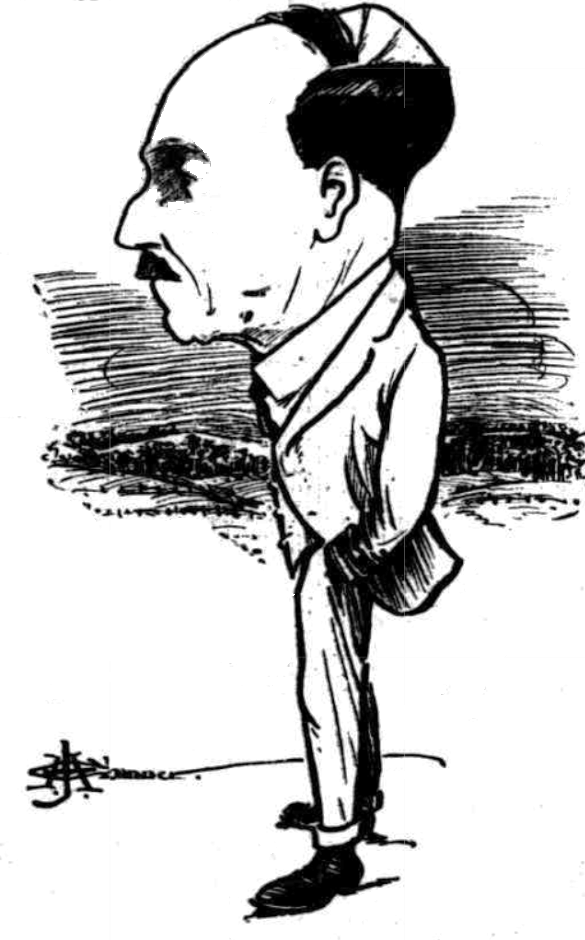
- Caricature of Edward Julius by J.H. Chinner
- Born: 25 September 1873; Sydney, Australia
- Died: 9 August 1951 (aged 77); Edgecliff, New South Wales
- Education: Calder House; Newington College
- Occupation: Conservator of forests for South Australia
- Years active: 1908–1935
- Known for: Forestry
- Spouse(s): Mary Louisa "Minnie" (née Clarke)
- Children: Charles Julius (1910–1965)
- Parent(s): William Warner and Sarah Jane Julius

Edward Julius (25 September 1873 – 9 August 1951) was Conservator of Forests for South Australia from 1924 until 1935.

== Biography ==
Julius was born in Sydney the son of William Warner Julius millowner and canegrower of Cudgen, New South Wales. His mother was Sarah Jane Julius who had emigrated from Dromore, County Tyrone around 1875.

His early education was at Calder House in Redfern when Dr Joseph David Sly (1844–1934) was the proprietor and headmaster. After that notable independent school closed down in Sydney Julius was enrolled aged 12 at Newington College on 28 January 1880. The following year Newington moved from Newington House on the Parramatta River to Stanmore. He was number 547 in the admissions register at Newington and finished his schooling in 1883.

He started with the forestry service around 1908. He was a forest guard at Warialda, New South Wales for the NSW Forestry Service (Note: This service has also been designated Forestry branch of Lands Department and Forestry Commission) in 1912, and at Narrabri in 1913. He was promoted to Forest Assessor, Armidale in 1917, then Acting Assistant Forester, Narrabri, in the same year, made permanent in 1918. He moved to Orange in 1920. In July 1921 he was appointed Forester in charge of the North-Western District of Tasmania, based in Burnie.

In October 1923 he won an appointment as Conservator of Forests in South Australia, succeeding Walter Gill. The appointment was controversial, having been made by the Government against the recommendation of the Public Service Board, and also criticised by H. H. Corbin for having no knowledge of silviculture, or of South Australian conditions, when there were many Adelaide graduates of the university's School of Forestry better qualified.

He retired in 1935 and joined the staff of Sapfor. His replacement was C. J. Rodgers BSc, a graduate of the University of Adelaide.

Julius, with J. S. Barnes and Charles H. Homes, general manager of Sapfor, (Note: South Australian Perpetual Forests, Ltd, in association with Sapfor Milling Company, Ltd) developed and patented a technique for speedier kiln-drying of Pinus insignis (or radiata) timber. The patent rights were assigned to Homes.

== Family ==
Julius married Mary Louisa "Minnie" Clarke (died 24 June 1951) on 23 May 1900. They had one son

- Charles Julius (15 April 1910 – 29 November 1965) was educated at St Peter's College, Adelaide, and Sydney University, studied anthropology, won the Frank Albert Prize in 1935, graduated MA 1937. He was government anthropologist for PNG, studied kuru.

While in Adelaide they had a home at Marlborough Street, College Park, then in 1930 moved to Wellington Flats, North Adelaide, and in 1931 to Pier Street, Glenelg. Their last home was at 180 Ocean Street, Edgecliff, New South Wales.

Mr. F. H. Julius, of Cudgen and W. J. Julius of North Richmond, Hawkesbury River, were his brothers.
