= Adelaide Benevolent Society =

Australian non-profit organization

Adelaide Benevolent Society is South Australia's oldest charity, formed in 1849. It is an independent non-profit organization that provides affordable housing for aged persons, families and new arrivals to South Australia. The society also provides emergency financial assistance for people in need.

== History ==
The society was formed on 2 February 1849, as the Adelaide Benevolent and Stranger's Friend Society Incorporated. Its objective was to provide "relief to the sick and indigent, especially among newly arrived immigrants". From its inception, one of the society's main aims was to provide cheap accommodation. This began to be realised from the 1869, when it rented, then purchased, cottages in the Adelaide city centre. These cottages were eventually replaced by housing units in the city's northern and southern suburbs. As well as providing subsidised accommodation, the society helps out in cases of unforeseen emergency, providing help with the cost of utility bills or short term financial aid where there is genuine need. The society's work among the poor and sick continued during Australia's economically depressed years from the late 1880s and 1890s through to the first decade of the 20th century, including the Great Depression of the 1930s. It was during this period that the Society was able to finance the construction of its own building with a bequest of 1000 pounds from Sir Thomas Elder. Elder Hall, at 17 Morialta Street, was completed in 1898 - this building still functions as the society's office. Former South Australian Premier Thomas Playford was a founding member of the Adelaide Benevolent Society; George Fife Angas and his son J. H. Angas served as vice presidents of the Society and made large financial contributions; and Sir John Colton, twice Premier of South Australia, was president from 1872 until his death in 1902. Stow Smith was associated with the Society for over 50 years.

== Services ==
The society owns more than 250 units and houses throughout the Adelaide metropolitan area that it rents to persons on lower incomes at rents below market rates. The society's properties are located in several suburbs around the metropolitan area from Elizabeth in the North to Victor Harbor in the South.

Properties are a mix of one and two bedroom units as well as some 3 bedroom houses. Potential tenants are assessed on a needs basis and the Society acts as a tenancy and property manager. In addition to housing, the society also provides some emergency financial assistance. Applications are assessed on a needs basis.
