= Edward Erskine Cleland =

Barrister and judge (1869-1943)

Edward Erskine Cleland (7 April 1869 – 1 July 1943 ) was a South Australian jurist, occasionally referred to as E. Erskine Cleland.

== History ==
Cleland was born in Beaumont, South Australia, the youngest of six sons of John Fullerton Cleland (1821 – 29 November 1901), Registrar-General of Births, Deaths, and Marriages, and Elizabeth Cleland, née Glen ( – 29 November 1901). He was educated at Prince Alfred College and the University of Adelaide, where he was a prominent member of the Law Debating Society. In 1880 he was articled with William Pope (died August 1923) and gained his LLB in 1890 and was called to the Bar the following day (26 April 1890), and was appointed associate to Mr. Justice Bundey soon after. In November 1891 he joined Fenn & Hardy as a partner. On 1 August 1898 he left that firm to join Josiah Symon, K.C. to form Symon, Rounsevell, and Cleland.

On 26 December 1912 he was appointed King's Counsel. The firm was thus remarkable in having two King's Counsels. Comprising Sir Josiah Henry Symon, Horace Vernon Rounsevell, Edward Erskine Cleland, and Charles James Ballaarat Symon, it was dissolved in July 1914, and re-formed as Symon, Rounsevell & Symon, at Gladstone Chambers, Pirie Street, Adelaide. Cleland carried on as barrister and solicitor at Selborne Chambers, also on Pirie Street.

Shortly after becoming KC, he founded a partnership with his son, Thomas Erskine Cleland, which in 1921 became Cleland, Cleland, & Teesdale Smith; then Cleland, Holland, & Teesdale Smith.

=== Selected cases ===
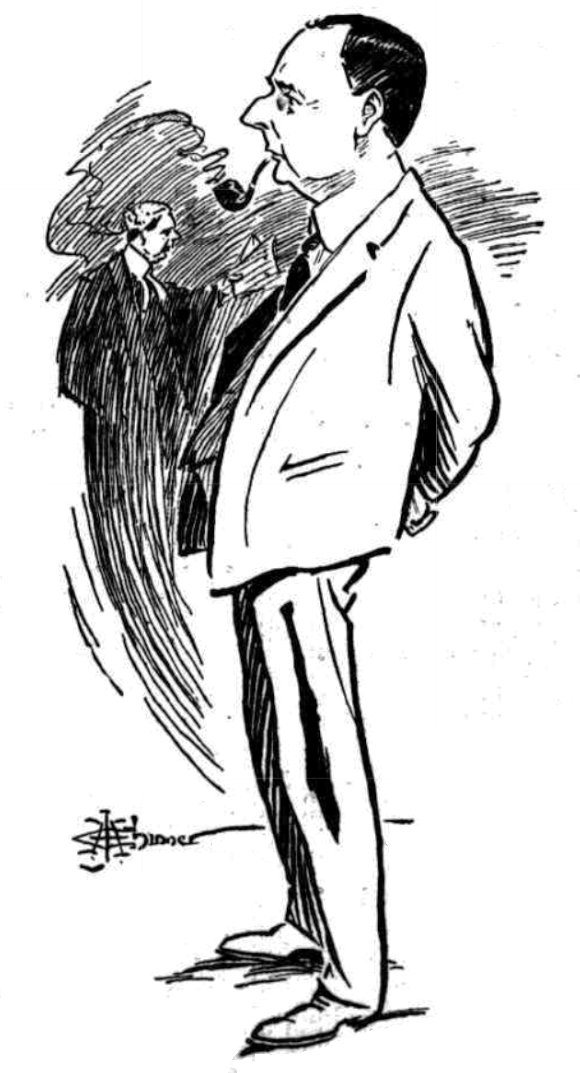
caricature by J. H. Chinner

He was a remarkably active barrister; in 1913 he was reckoned to have more cases before the High Court than any other counsel; prominent cases in which Cleland was retained include:

- The cigar case (J. L. Mueller v. the Collector of Customs)
- The corset case (Weingarten Brothers v. G. & R. Wills & Co.)
- The Admiralty case (collision between Norma and Ardencraig)
- The Maslin divorce case
- The Mile End land case (McDonald v. Railways Commissioner)

In the High Court, Cleland was involved in the cases of

- Stephens v. the Tramways Trust (with T. S. O'Halloran)
- Crozier Will case: Crozier v. Wigley (with Paris Nesbit, K.C.)
- Disputed boundary South Australia v. Victoria (with Sir Josiah Symon, K.C., George Murray, K.C., and Paris Nesbit, K.C.) in which Cleland was sent to London to argue the case before the Privy Council.
- Child custody, Kroehn v. Kroehn
- Alexander v. Federated Sawmill Employees Association

== Called to the bench ==
On 5 March 1936 at age 67, (Note: Unlike other public servants, who at that time were made to retire at 65, judges had no such obligation) he was appointed a judge of the Supreme Court at a salary of £2,000 per annum. The vacancy had been brought about by the death of Mr Justice Piper. His first sitting as Mr Justice Cleland was on 16 March 1936.

== Other interests ==
Cleland was a member of the

- Law Society, and served as Vice-President
- board of the South Australian Football League, and served as chairman
- board of the Kindergarten Union, and served as chairman

He died in an Adelaide private hospital, following a medical procedure. He had been suffering ill-health for some time.

== Family ==
E(dward) Erskine Cleland (6 November 1869 – 1 July 1943) married Edith Mary Auld (1867 – 25 August 1928) on 12 April 1893. She was the only daughter of W. P. Auld. They had three children:

- Tom Erskine Cleland (9 March 1894 – ) was an Adelaide lawyer and City Coroner.
- Isabel Erskine "Bobs" Cleland (1900 – 1963) married Alfred Chambers Lucas (1896 – 1997) in August 1930
- Audrey Erskine Cleland (10 September 1903 – 1981)

They had homes on East Terrace, Adelaide, and Church Terrace, Walkerville
