= Brian Wibberley =

British Methodist minister (1866-1944)

Brian Wibberley (7 November 1866 – 3 June 1944) was an Australian Methodist minister. He served for over 50 years in Victoria, Western Australia, and South Australia.

== Early life and education ==
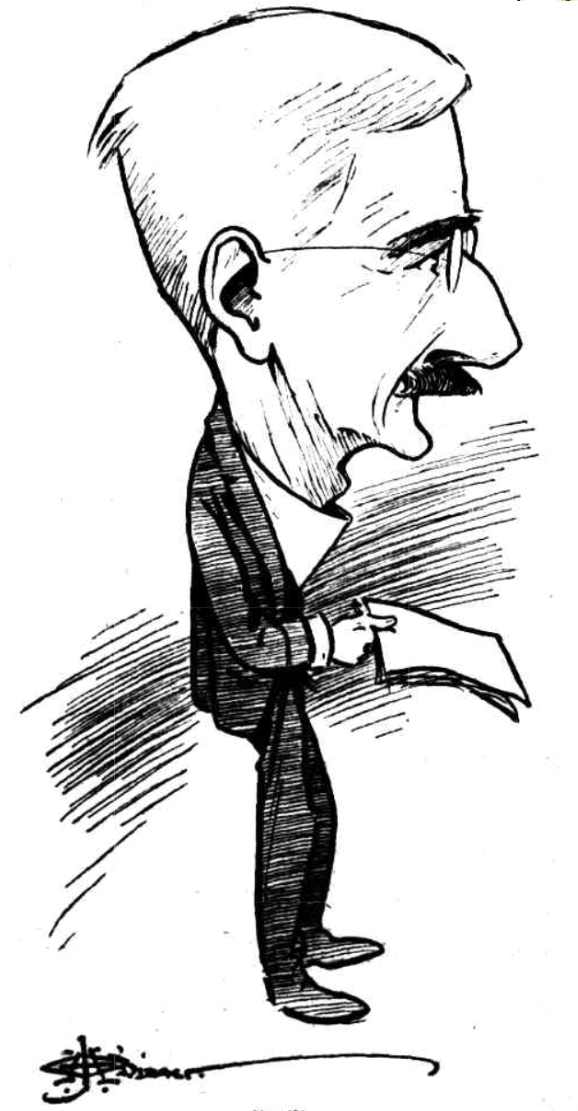
caricature by J. H. Chinner

Brian Wibberley was born on 7 November 1866 in Ashbourne, Derbyshire, youngest son of farmer Brian Wibberley and his wife Ann, née Riley. He was educated in the grammar school of that town. His mother died when he was 11 years of age, and having been "born again", began teaching at the Sunday school at age 12.

== Career ==
Wibberley was ordained in 1885 and in 1886 preached at Middlesbrough in Yorkshire. That same year he was sent to Victoria, Australia, as a Primitive Methodist missionary.

=== Victoria ===
Wibberley preached his first sermon in the newly completed Primitive Methodist Church in Paisley Street, Footscray on 3 October 1886. He was given charge of the Ballarat church in 1887, then Brighton, Victoria, and founded a new church in North Brighton, at the corner of Byron and Male streets in 1892, where the annual assembly of the Methodist connexion of Victoria and Tasmania was held the following year.

Methodist churches have a policy of moving their ministers around — four years being the usual maximum, five under extenuating circumstances.

His next charge was Maryborough, Victoria in 1895, followed by Melbourne, where he conducted a mission on Lygon Street, Carlton.

=== South Australia ===
In 1898 he succeeded the Revs. Hugh Gilmore and J. Day Thompson at the church on Wellington Square, North Adelaide.

In 1902 he took over the Moonta church, and in 1906 Kent Town Methodist Church. During this time he mentored J. Leslie Glasson (1889–1923), an outstanding student from Kadina who did original work in Cambridge and Launceston, then died in a boating accident.

=== Western Australia ===
In 1910 he was transferred to the Wesley Church, Perth. In 1913 he was appointed first Principal of the Theological College, Perth, coinciding with the union of Methodist churches in that State.

=== Back to Victoria ===
After nine years in Perth, Wibberley was assigned to Malvern, Victoria, where he was appointed superintendent of the Malvern Methodist Circuit.

In May 1922, while still stationed in Malvern, he visited his son, a medical doctor in Tumby Bay, South Australia and while passing through Adelaide took the opportunity to revisit his old parishioners in Kent Town.

=== SA again ===
In 1924 he returned to Kent Town, in time for the church's Diamond Jubilee, for which his contributions were greatly appreciated.

He retired in April 1929, having served the Kent Town Methodist Church for a total of 11 years.

== Other interests ==
In 1895 he enrolled in the Faculty of Music at Melbourne University which he carried through to the University of Adelaide, where on 13 December 1911 he was admitted to the Bachelor of Music degree in absentia, being then in Perth. The Chancellor, Sir Samuel Way, remarked on the fact that his son Brian William Wibberley received his B.Sc. on the same day.

He was a music critic for The West Australian in 1911.

From March 1901 to March 1911 he was editor of the Australian Christian Commonwealth, a magazine devoted to literature and music.

He was author of several books on religion and music:

- Brian Wibberley (1905). Marks of Methodism, and other studies. Whillas & Ormiston. p. 192.
- Brian Wibberley (1916). History of Western Australian Methodism.
- Brian Wibberley (1934). Music and Religion: A Historical and Philosophical Survey. Epworth. p. 317. Summary: "Includes reference to Aboriginal music from a cultural evolutionary perspective; references the work of Spencer and Gillen, Basedow and E. Harold Davies; Aboriginal music as primitive but not degraded, dehumanised or perverse." (National Library of Australia)

== An assessment ==
Wibberley was praised by the Adelaide satirical magazine Quiz and The Lantern for his plain outspokenness. He had recently given a sermon against British imperialism as it applied to the Boer War, and its support by the Christian churches.

The high priests of Greed and War, of Mammon and Moloch, have joined affinity with the Church. Priests dare babble of a God of Peace, even while their hands are red with guiltless blood . . . I believe in Greed Almighty, maker of every thing worth having in heaven and earth, and in "Force" its only begotten Son, born of Jingo-patriotism, suffered under Righteousness, was never dead or buried, but, recently rose under the cant of Imperialism and descended to Parliament, Press and Pulpit, whence it sits to judge the world. (Note: "John Bull's creed, Based on the Athanasian Creed)

Quiz concluded

"Quiz expected this sort of thing to come from a parson—after it had come from everybody else. It is not like the clerical profession to preach the truth—on the questions of the day they may assert abstract truths, or what they conceive to be such, but seldom do they grapple with the real issues which daily effect the destiny of the world. There are now two parsons in this community who have dared to expose the injustice of this unholy struggle—Joe Berry and Brian Wibberley. Quiz would like to have a drink with them on the strength of it, but he fears they are sad teetotalers."

== Personal life and death ==
Wibberley married Maria Ann Hunt ( – 15 December 1935) of Ballarat on 2 April 1890.

He died on 3 June 1944 after a few weeks' illness. His remains were buried in Payneham Cemetery with those of his wife.
