= Walter Gill =

Walter Gill FLS (13 October 1851 – 17 July 1929) was a forestry administrator in South Australia.

== History ==
Gill was born in Northamptonshire, England, a son Rev. Walter Gill, Independent minister in Parkstone, Dorset, England. He was employed in the banking business from 1869 to 1876, when he emigrated to South Australia. He joined the South Australian Public Service in August 1884 as sub-inspector of credit selections, then in 1886 was appointed chief forester at Wirrabara. In 1890 he was promoted to Conservator of Forests, which he retained until December 1923, when he retired. His successor was Edward Julius.

He was the first person to realise the commercial potential of Pinus insignis (now radiata).

He was also noted for his private garden, Dover Street, Malvern.

== Family ==
Gill married Elizabeth Frances Hiddlestone (c. 1862 – 31 January 1916) of Launceston, Tasmania on 12 October 1885.

- Frederick Gill (25 September 1886 – ) lived in Somerville, Victoria
- Edgar Alfred Gill (10 December 1887 – ) married Marjorie Bruce Gouldsmith Fielder in 1921, lived in Sydney
- William Ernest Gill (14 October 1889 – 1967) married Annie Doreen Axford in 1925, lived in Keith, South Australia.
- Hilda Beatrice Gill AMUA (1894 – 1975) educated at Methodist Ladies' College, won the Brookman Scholarship to the Elder Conservatorium in 1914.

Tom Gill ISO (1849–1923), Under-treasurer of South Australia for many years, has been described as a brother. This is contradicted by the names given of their respective parents and birthplaces.

== Recognition ==
- Walter Gill was elected a Fellow of the Linnean Society of London
- His name is commemorated on a bronze plaque on the Jubilee 150 Walkway, North Terrace, Adelaide
