= Port Adelaide Racing Club =

The Port Adelaide Racing Club (PARC) was founded in 1890.

The first meeting of the club was held in the same year on a course located on Grand Junction Road and in 1895 transferred to a leased site at Cheltenham Park.

In 1921 the club had sufficient funds to purchase the site for £25,000.

Following a government decree the club was merged with the South Australian Jockey Club (SAJC) in 1973 and by 1975 administration of the course had been passed over to the SAJC.

Although the club is now defunct race meetings were held at the Cheltenham Park Racecourse until 2009. The racecourse has since been turned into a housing estate and park.
