= William Alfred Wearing =

Australian judge

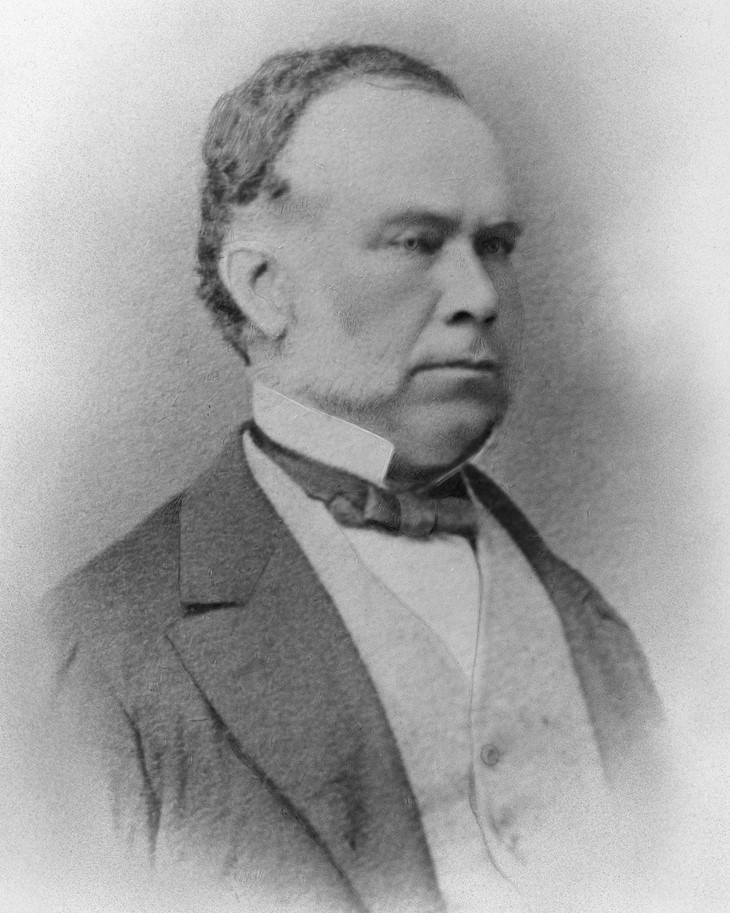

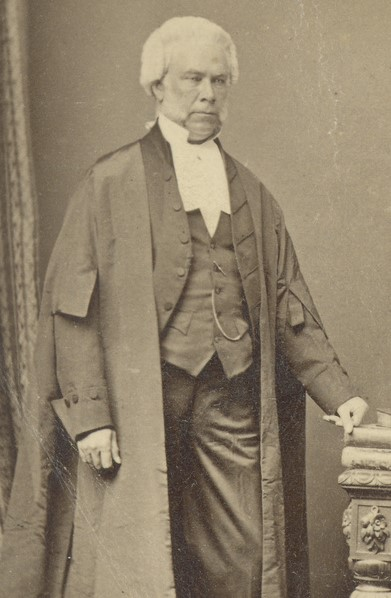

William Alfred Wearing KC (12 November 1816 – 24 February 1875) was a jurist in the Colony of South Australia, who lost his life in the wreck of S.S. Gothenburg.

Wearing was born in London, a son of businessman Christopher Hammond Wearing (ca.1785 – 29 February 1860) and his wife Elizabeth Augusta, née Soulsby. He was educated at Trinity College, or St John's College, Cambridge, where he took the degree of B.A. He studied law, and was called to the bar at Lincoln's Inn in 1847. He shortly afterwards left for South Australia, following his parents, who had emigrated in 1839. He immediately began practising and it was not long before he was taken into partnership with the Charles Fenn, one of the largest practices in Adelaide. The partnership was dissolved, and Mr. Wearing was appointed Crown Solicitor, but was able to continue in private practice.

In the earlier days of the colony he occasionally took part in colonial politics; working for the election of Mr. (later Judge) Gwynne, and also in securing the return of Dr. Wark. In 1866 he served on the secret court of inquiry which forced the resignation of Police Commissioner Peter Warburton. He took an active part in the 1867 sacking of Mr. Justice Benjamin Boothby and was appointed by the Hon Arthur Blyth's or the Hon Henry Ayers' Government as the third judge of the Supreme Court of South Australia in his place. Part of his duties involved holding the Palmerston Circuit Court in the Northern Territory, from where he was returning when the Gothenburg was wrecked. He was not one of the 22 persons who survived.

Lionel James Pelham, judge's associate and clerk of arraigns and Joseph James Whitby, who accompanied Judge Wearing to the Northern Territory, in the capacity of acting Crown solicitor, were also lost in the Gothenburg.

Wearing's place on the Bench was taken by Justice Randolph Isham Stow Q.C., but he died three years later on 16 September 1878.

== Family ==
On 4 October 1860 he married Jessie Clark (1842 – 8 January 1906) daughter of W. H. Clark They had three daughters and two sons, who, with their mother, left for London shortly after his death.

- Jessie Blanche Wearing (1861 – ) married Andrew MacLachlan on 12 December 1885
- William Edward Wearing (1863 – )
- Mary Waring (1865 – )
- Mabel Wearing (1862 – ) married Frank Towers Cooper, part-owner of The Scotsman on 1 August 1893
- Charles Elton Wearing (1873 – 15 September 1898)
