= Hindmarsh Square Congregational Church =

Coordinates: 34°55′27″S 138°36′24″E

Hindmarsh Square Congregational Church (former)
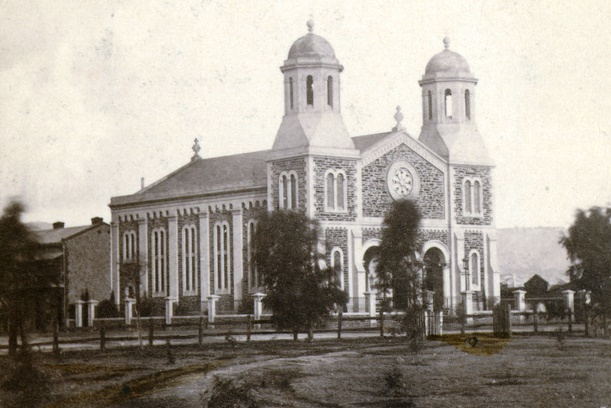
- Hindmarsh Square Congregational Church, c. 1867
- Hindmarsh Square Congregational Church (former)
- Country: Australia
- Previous denomination: Congregational (1861 – 1930)

History
- Status: Church (1861 – 1930); Broadcast studios (1930 – 1974
- Founded: 21 August 1861
- Founder: William Peacock
- Dedicated: 5 September 1862

Architecture
- Functional status: Demolished (c. 1980s)
- Architect: George Abbott
- Architectural type: Church
- Construction cost: A£5,075
- Demolished: c. 1980s

Specifications
- Capacity: 450 people

The Hindmarsh Square Congregational Church was a Congregational church, located in Hindmarsh Square, Adelaide, South Australia, Australia.

The building was demolished in the 1980s.

== History ==
=== Establishment of the Congregational Church in Adelaide ===
The Congregational (or 'Independent') Church in Adelaide had its beginnings in 1837 in a marquee erected by T. Q. Stow, then progressed to a pug and pine chapel on North Terrace, succeeded in November 1840 by a more substantial building on Freeman Street (later part of Gawler Place). In June 1851 a breakaway group led by William Peacock and I. J. Barclay founded their "Ebenezer Chapel" on land donated by Peacock off Rundle Street, near the old East Terrace Market. Revs. M. H. Hodge, of Port Adelaide, and George Stonehouse, of the Lefevre Terrace Baptist Church, North Adelaide took the first services before Rev. Joseph Haynes was appointed their pastor. The associated "Peacock Chapel" at the rear was (1852–1855) the first home of J. L. Young's Adelaide Educational Institution.

The rush to the Victorian goldfields, of which Haynes was a participant, led to the closure of the Ebenezer Chapel for fifteen months.

In July 1853 Rev. John Hotham, recently arrived from England, reorganized the church. Two years later, Hotham took charge of the Port Elliot chapel, and his place was taken by Rev. Edward Dewhirst. A year later Dewhirst left to join the Baptist Church, and the British and Foreign Bible Society appointed Rev. F. W. Cox to take charge of the church. In the meantime Stow supervised both branches of the Congregational Church in Adelaide. Cox arrived in South Australia in 1857 and preached his first sermon at the Ebenezer Place (named for the chapel and not vice versa) chapel. Soon the little church ("obscurely situated in a dirty lane off Rundle street" — Rev. W. Harcus) was full to overflowing, and it was clear a larger chapel was called for.

=== Development of the church building ===
A public meeting was held at White's Assembly Rooms, with William Peacock presiding over a gathering of 1,000 people. Vigorous addresses were delivered by the Hons. J. H. Barrow, Alexander Hay and Thomas Reynolds and Revs. William Butters, William Harcus, and Silas Mead of the Flinders Street Baptist Church, and as a result plans for a new building were soon under way.

A block near the centre of the east side of Hindmarsh Square was purchased for £700 and in the first year the congregation raised £1,030 towards a new building, which was matched by Peacock. George Abbott (who also designed the first Clayton Congregational Church and the Flinders Street Presbyterian Church, died 3 April 1869) was the selected architect and English & Brown (also known for Chalmers/Scots Church) the builders. Abbott's design, described as "modified Byzantine", provided for a pair of steeples, which the committee decided to do without, as an economy measure. The cornerstone was laid by Peacock on 21 August 1861 and new building, built to seat 450 and with its schoolroom and vestries completed a year later, cost £5,075. Extensive stabling was erected to the south of the building, which was to have been called the Ebenezer Congregational Church, but that was rarely observed, invariably being referred to by its location. The first service was held on Friday 5 September 1862, conducted by Revs. J. Jefferis and H. Cheetham.

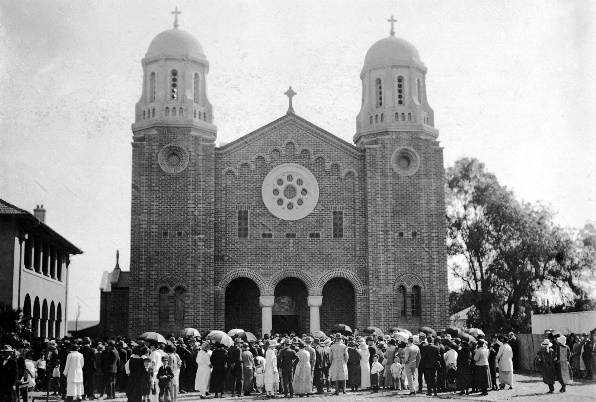
Compare with St. Saviour's Catholic Church, Port Road, Hindmarsh

Rev. Cox preached his first sermon in the new church on Sunday 7 September 1862, assisted by Charles Manthorpe, and C. W. Evan, and was uninterruptedly associated with this church until 1897, and died eight years later.

Rev. S. Lenton served the Hindmarsh Square Church from 1898 to 1904, when he transferred to Rose Park, and was followed by Henry Gainford, who shortly transferred to Carlton, Victoria, and was replaced by Joseph Thomas Huston (died 1953).

The building later became a "Protestant Hall", controlled by John Amos, and the subject of complex financial manoeuvering.

== Deconsecration and later use ==
From 1930, the Australian Broadcasting Company (a commercial organisation) took over the building for the 5CL broadcast studio as part of a national broadcasting network. This became the Adelaide studios of 5AN and 5CL for the Australian Broadcasting Commission. The church and its outbuildings became the orchestral studio and PMG technical workshops. The circular detail between the turrets was emblazoned with the callsigns "5AN" and "5CL" and lightning bolt motifs. The stables were demolished for a complex of ABC studios and other facilities. The broadcast studios and facilities joined the TV studios at Collinswood in 1974. What remained of the original Church building was demolished in the 1980s. Nothing now remains of these structures.
