= F. W. Cox =

English Congregationalist pastor

Francis William Cox (January 1817 – 29 March 1904) was the first pastor of the Hindmarsh Square Congregational church in Hindmarsh Square, Adelaide, South Australia.

== Life and career ==
Cox was born in London, "within the sound of Bow Bells", a son of a hat-maker with an established business in the city. He was educated at St Saviour's School, a classmate of Sydney Waterlow. Cox served an apprenticeship, but left the trade to train as a schoolteacher at the Normal College, Borough Road, run by the British and Foreign Bible Society. The principal, Henry Dunn (1800–1878), author of Principles of Teaching, or The Normal School Handbook 1837, offered him a position with the projected branch of the school in Cairo, but the scheme changed with the Egyptian boys being brought to London instead, and Cox was put in charge of a school in Gloucester.

While there, he served as lay preacher at the village of Longney. His next post was to a school in Croydon, then was trained as a missionary at the Congregational Home Mission College, near Bedford. He was then sent to serve as pastor at the Congregational Church at Market Weighton in the East Riding of Yorkshire, and after four years received the call to Adelaide, which he accepted, perhaps influenced by his sister Martha Cox (1826 – 25 June 1919), who married Charles Cleeve Collison (1820 – 7 November 1884) and was mother of Charles Nicholas Collison and emigrated to South Australia in 1849 or 1850.

The Congregational (or "Independent") Church in Adelaide, founded by T. Q. Stow, from November 1840 had a chapel in Freeman Street (later part of Gawler Place). In 1851 a breakaway group led by William Peacock and I. J. Barclay founded their "Ebenezer Chapel" opened in June 1851 on land donated by Peacock near the old East Terrace Market.

Cox arrived in South Australia with his widowed mother Sarah Cox (c. 1891 – 3 December 1865) aboard Victoria in November 1857 and preached his first sermon at the Ebenezer Place (named for the chapel and not vice versa) chapel. Soon the little church ("obscurely situated in a dirty lane off Rundle street" — Rev. W. Harcus) was full to overflowing, and a larger premises was clearly called for.

A public meeting was held at White's Assembly Rooms, with William Peacock presiding over a gathering of 1,000 people. Vigorous addresses were delivered by the Hons. J. H. Barrow, Alexander Hay and Thomas Reynolds and Revs. William Butters, William Harcus, and Silas Mead of the Flinders Street Baptist Church, and as a result plans for a new building were soon under way.
The cornerstone of the new Hindmarsh Square Church was laid by William Peacock on 21 August 1861 and new building, built to seat 450 and with its schoolroom and vestries completed a year later.

Rev. Cox preached his first sermon in the new church on Sunday 7 September, assisted by Charles Manthorpe, and C. W. Evan, and was uninterruptedly associated with this church until 1897. He had a most harmonious relationship with his "flock", and resisted invitations, possibly more lucrative, to leave for Melbourne. He has been described as a tireless worker for the sick, the aged and the dispossessed, notably the Aboriginal population. He was closely connected with the London Missionary Society, the South Australian Auxiliary of the British and Foreign Bible Society and Union College. Cox was twice Chairman of the Congregational Union, and occupied the post of secretary for 17 years. He was secretary of the Fraternal Association of Congregational Ministers and chairman of the Aborigines' Friends' Association. He was, with George Taplin, largely instrumental in establishing the Point Mcleay Mission. Cox was an authority on art and frequently called upon to act as judge at art exhibitions conducted by schools and amateur art groups, but reluctantly had to relinquish this pleasant duty when faced with failing eyesight.

He resigned his pastorate on 21 November 1897 and died eight years later, and was succeeded by Rev. S. Lenton, who served the Hindmarsh Square Church from 1898 to 1904.

His widow presented his valuable coin collection to the University,

== Family ==
Francis William Cox (January 1817 – 29 March 1904) married Mary Ainsley Aldersey (c. 1833 – 14 March 1922) in 1863. She was a daughter of Richard Aldersey of Noarlunga.

- Lois Ainsley Cox (18 September 1864 – 10 August 1892) was the first woman missionary from Australia to India as part of the Zenana missions. She contracted "jungle fever" (possible malaria), returned to Adelaide in 1892 and died eight months later. The London Missionary Society orphanage at Salem, Tamil Nadu, supported by J. H. Angas and the Congregational Churches in South Australia, was later known as the Lois Cox Home in her memory.
- Rachel Mary Cox (17 September 1866 – 1927) married widower Walter Hutley ( – 1930) on 27 December 1898, lived at Largs Bay.
- Aldersey Frank Cox (28 November 1867 – 1963) married Alice May Turner ( – ) He was Brisbane manager for D. & W. Murray, Limited, built home "Onkaparinga".
- Catherine/Katharine Haydon Cox (29 December 1869 – 5 September 1946)
- Lancelot Dawson Cox (21 October 1874 – 26 December 1899)

They had a home on Wakefield Street.
