= Gertrude Mead =

Australian medical practitioner (1867–1919)

Gertrude Ella Mead
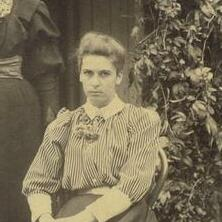
- Gertrude Mead in 1894
- Born: December 31, 1867
- Died: November 6, 1919 (aged 51)
- Education: MBBS, University of Adelaide
- Occupation: Doctor
- Father: Silas Mead
- Relatives: Lilian Mead (sister)

Gertrude Ella Mead (31 December 1867 – 6 November 1919) was an Australian medical doctor and advocate for women and children. Mead was the third woman doctor registered in Western Australia. She was a founder of the Child protection society of Western Australia as well as an early advocate for homes for the aged and daycare centres.

== Early life and education ==
Gertrude Ella Mead was born on 31 December 1867 in Adelaide, the third child of Baptist minister Silas Mead and Ann Mead (née Staples). Her mother died when she was six, and she and her siblings spent time in the care of their aunt and uncle while their father returned in England. Her father remarried when she was ten.

Mead attended Flinders Street Baptist Church with her family and was baptised by immersion in 1881 after attending campaigns by Emilia Baeyertz. She attended the Advanced School for Girls alongside her sister Lilian, the first public secondary school in South Australia and the first school to allow girls to matriculate and qualify for university. She was admitted to the University of Adelaide in 1882 "by special dispensation" of the Vice-Chancellor as she was under sixteen. She matriculated in 1884 with second class honours, and again in 1885 in third place in the State. Mead contracted typhoid in 1887 and remained frail throughout the rest of her life.

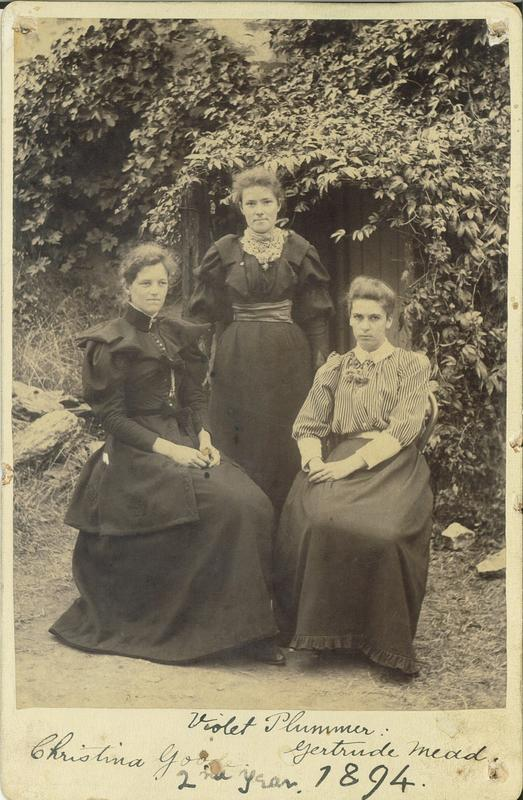
2nd year medical students in 1894, Christina Goode (1874 -1951), Violet Plummer and Mead

Mead initially trained in nursing at the Adelaide Children's Hospital from 1890 to 1891, and then began a MBBS at the University of Adelaide, coming second in her first year class. However, she and her two fellow female medical students, Violet Plummer and Christina L. Goode, had to defend themselves against claims of impropriety - in particular, Mead wrote in letters to the newspapers, that they had "on no occasion examined any patient after 5 p.m." Their cohort eventually transferred to the University of Melbourne; and Mead graduated MBBS on 23 December 1897. Mead then spent two years in the United Kingdom working as a resident physician and house surgeon at Belgrave Hospital for Children in London, Leith Hospital in Edinburgh, and Dublin Hospital.

== Career ==
Mead returned to Australia in 1901, moving to Perth where her father and sister Blanche were now living. She was the third woman registered as a doctor in Western Australia. She practiced from her home, with a focus on women and children's health. She became a medical adviser to the Ministering Children's League Convalescent Home and a nurse edicator of the St John Ambulance Association. Mead and Roberta Jull initiated the West Australian Health Society to address "the alarming mortality among infants", making suggestions for the education of mothers and improvement of sanitation in dairies to the Colonial Secretary of Western Australia.

Mead was a medical officer for the House of Mercy for unmarried mothers from 1904 to 1907, and physician for the Perth Children's Hospital which opened in 1909. When the King Edward Memorial Hospital opened in 1916, she was the obstetric representative of the Australasian Trained Nurses' Association. She also represented that association on the Western Australian Council for Venereal Disease and presented a report in 1918 calling for greater education of nurses on the subject. She proposed the idea of district nurses in Perth.

Mead was a member of the Karrakatta Club, the first women's club in Australia, and served as vice president from 1912 to 1914, as well as chairwoman of various programs. She gave talks on women's work and international issues, and Red Cross work. In 1912, she was appointed as medical representative to the inaugural Senate of the University of Western Australia, one of two women of the 18 members chosen by the government, who began to advocate for women's rights at the university. Mead remained on the university's senate and education committee for the rest of her life.

During World War I, Mead taught Red Cross nurses and was a medical officer at the Fremantle Base Hospital as well as a Perth divisional surgeon. She was a life member of St John Ambulance Brigade.

Mead was one of the founders of the Children's Protection Society of Western Australia in 1906, which tried to "control the worst abuses of 'baby farming' and began to license foster mothers who were suitable to care for needy children." In 1909, she wrote in Dependent Children, "It is only within the last century that the civilised world has slowly awakened to a sense of its responsibility towards the children born of white parents who come under the heading of "unwanted"."

In 1912, Mead joined the committee of the Silver Chain Nursing League and proposed a scheme to build cottage homes for elderly people. The first such cottage, on Wright Street in North Perth was designed and furnished by Mead and Muriel Chase. She began to investigate a similar idea for old people's homes in Adelaide. In 1907, Mead wrote a paper called "Medical Missions" for the WA Baptist magazine, emphasising the need for doctors to "embrace spiritual work as well as regular medical care - to win souls while healing bodies." Mead was a member of the Perth Central Baptist Church, where her brother-in-law A.S. Wilson was the pastor. She was known for her "deep compassion for the poor."

== Death and legacy ==
Mead returned to Adelaide in 1919 to visit her brother, a medical missionary in India who was on leave. She suffered a cerebral embolism and died on 6 November 1919. She is buried in the West Terrace Cemetery. Upon her death,The Bulletin newspaper called her "one of [Perth's] most useful citizens."

The Silver Chain Cottage Homes in Perth were opened in 1920, and in 1981 the only surviving home was renamed "Dr Gertrude Mead Cottage Home". In 1987, the federal government named Mead Street in Chisholm, Australian Capital Territory after her.
