= Manthorpe =

Manthorpe is the name of two places, both in the South Kesteven district of Lincolnshire, England:

- Manthorpe, Grantham
- Manthorpe, Bourne

It is also an English language surname. Notable people with the surname include:

- Charles Manthorpe (1836–1898), Congregationalist minister in Glenelg, South Australia
