= John Garrard Raws =

Baptist minister in Adelaide (1851–1929)

John Garrard Raws (8 October 1851 – 28 February 1929) was a Baptist minister in Adelaide. Two of his sons were killed in the Battle of Pozières. Raws donated their letters from the field to the Australian War Memorial.

== History ==
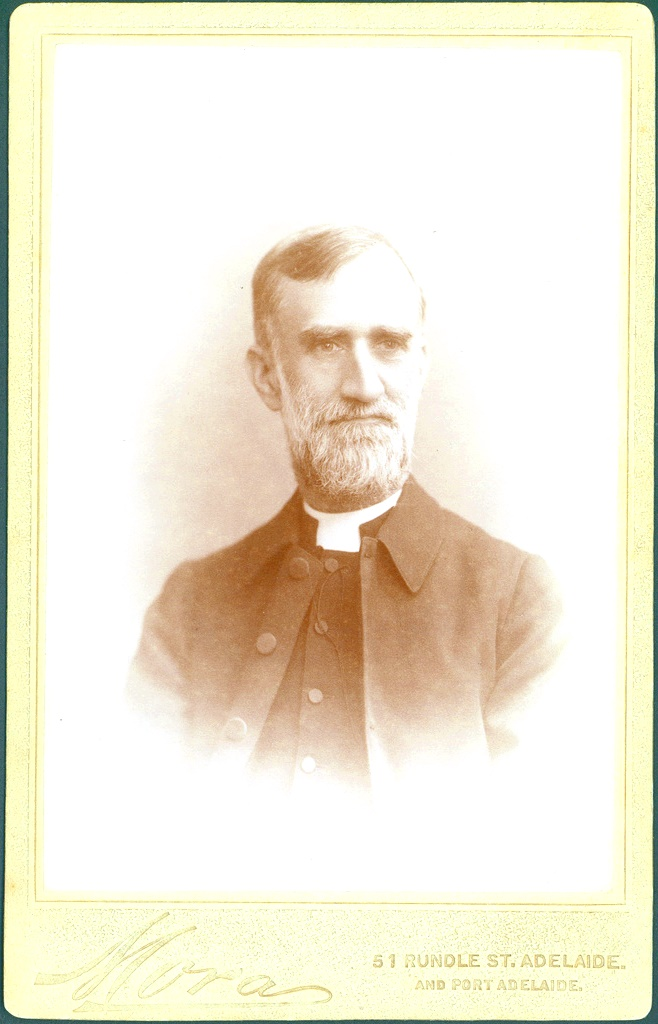
Rev. J. G. Raws

Raws was born in England.

In 1877 he took over the Baptist church at Kimbolton, Huntingdonshire, and around 1880 was transferred to Ulverston. In 1883 he was made assistant to Dr Alexander Maclaren at Manchester. In 1889 he was first pastor of the Harrogate Baptist Church.

Raws and his family arrived in South Australia on 24 March 1895, and settled in Adelaide. Raws served for three years as co-pastor with Silas Mead at the Flinders Street Baptist Church, then on Mead's retirement served as pastor 1897–1905. He was a believer in church union, and served as president of the Council of Churches in South Australia 1900–1903.

He resigned after ten years, and served at Knightsbridge, South Australia and Magill, South Australia 1907–1909, followed by Unley Park 1909–1913. The family left for Melbourne and thence to England for a holiday.

Raws returned to Adelaide during the 1914–1918 war, to act as pastor in charge of the Flinders Street church, while the regular minister, Peter Fleming, was serving overseas.

Raws and his wife each spent their last days at a nursing home at Mount Barker. Raws died on the morning of 28 February 1929, in his seventy-eighth year. His son, Sir Lennon Raws had been notified of his imminent death but arrived too late. Following his express instructions, his remains were cremated.

== Recognition ==
On Foreign Mission Day 1929, Rev. A. C. Hill moved a resolution:

That in grateful recognition of the valued services to the Baptist denomination of the late John Garrard Raws, who for 34 years was associated with the work of the Baptist Union and Furreedpore Mission. This annual assembly hereby agrees to establish a fund to be known as the John G. Raws memorial, to establish a scholarship for the sons of Baptist ministers.

The motion was seconded by Stow Smith and adopted. Smith's eulogy included:

To know him was to love him. It was my privilege to meet Mr. and Mrs. Raws and their family when they arrived in South Australia. "For 34 years, I have enjoyed his close friendship. I shall always associate with the name of Mr. Raws the characteristics of alertness of mind, sympathy for the needs of others, and thoroughness in all his works. He was methodical in his habits, a wise counsellor, and a man whose judgment was invariably correct.

In 1930 a memorial tablet to Raws was unveiled at the Harrogate Baptist Church, in recognition of his service 1889–1895 as the church's first minister, (Note: There is a discrepancy here, as the church was opened in June 1883.) also recognising the deaths of two sons in the 1914–1918 war.

== Family ==
Raws married Mary Jane Lennon (c. 1853 – 3 September 1934) in England sometime around 1875

- (William) Lennon Raws (1878–1958), later Sir Lennon Raws
- John Alexander "Alec" Raws (21 September 1883 – 23 August 1916) born Manchester, educated Prince Alfred College, employed as a journalist, enlisted 21 July 1915, died at the Battle of Pozières. On his enlistment form he chose to "solemnly declare" rather than swear, and for "Religious Denomination" he wrote "None".
- (Robert) Goldthorpe "Goldy" Raws (26 May 1886 – 28 July 1916) born Manchester, educated 4 years at Prince Alfred College and 4 years at Way College. Employed as warehouseman, enlisted on 8 January 1915 (gave "Baptist" as religion) and served at Gallipoli from September 1915, posted missing 28 July 1916 at Pozières, presumed dead.
- Helen Josephine Raws married David Norman McBride (died 1944) in 1904. They had a home in Victoria.
- (Marion) Gwen Raws married Edward Vincent Clark (1876–1952) Lecturer in Electrical Engineering at University of Adelaide in London in 1919. They had a home in Highgate, later Davenport Tce, Hazelwood Park.

In 1915 they had a home at 76 Cheltenham Street, Malvern, South Australia.
