= Ellen Arnold =

(1858–1931) missionary

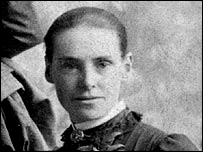
- Born: July 5, 1858; Aston, Warwickshire, England
- Died: July 9, 1931 (aged 73); Ataikola, Bangladesh
- Occupations: Teacher; Missionary

Ellen Arnold (5 July 1858 – 9 July 1931) was an Australian teacher and the first and longest serving Australian Baptist missionary.

== Early life ==
Ellen Arnold was born on 5 July 1858 in Aston, Warwickshire, England to Alfred Arnold and Ellen Jane Seager. Her father was a jeweller in Birmingham.

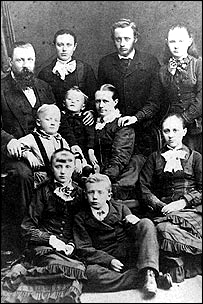
Ellen Arnold's family

They migrated to Adelaide in 1879, where they became members of Flinders Street Baptist Church. She became a teacher, after being in the first intake of the Adelaide Teachers' College.

== Career ==
Arnold was influenced by her pastor, Silas Mead, who had founded the Australian Baptist Missionary Society in 1864. After some medical training, she and Marie Glibert went to Furreedpore (then part of British India) in October 1882, the first missionaries sent by the newly formed Society, undertaking "zenana work".

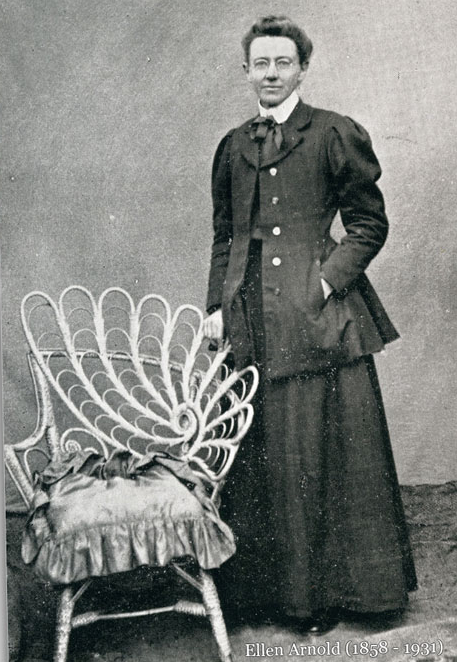
Ellen Arnold in later life

Arnold returned to Australia in 1884 suffering illness and undertook a tour of the colonies and New Zealand which became known as the "crusade of Ellen Arnold." This led to the establishment of the Queensland and New Zealand Baptist Missionary Societies. Four other young women decided to join her (becoming known as the "Five Barley Loaves") in East Bengal, which then became the primary mission field for Australian Baptists.

Arnold purchased land in Comilla and began building a mission house in 1889, before moving there in 1890. She spent her life preaching, establishing schools and dispensing medicine. She became fluent in Bengali and helped establish the East Bengal Baptist Union. She later moved to Pubna where there were tensions with other missionaries, particularly as the men, who had arrived later, controlled the finances and movements of the women. In 1912 she was instructed by the Australian society to "stop interfering in the Pubna men's department or come home." From 1913, she lived in a thatched, mud-floored village hut among the local people rather than in the typical British Raj style properties of her colleagues.

Arnold retired to Australia in 1930, with the East Bengal Baptist Union taking over her work, but returned to India as a voluntary worker and died in Ataikola on 9 July 1931 after refusing surgery for a malignant growth.

== Honours ==
In 1919 Arnold was awarded the Kaisar-i-Hind Medal for public service in India, but declined to accept it. The Ellen Arnold Memorial Dispensary at Ataikola was established in her name and the Bangladesh Baptist Union observes the day of her death as "Ellen Arnold Day." In 2014 Rosalind Gooden published her biography.
