= Unley Uniting Church =

Congregationalist church in Unley, Australia

Coordinates: 34°57′07″S 138°36′28″E

Unley Uniting Church is a small church on Unley Road, Unley, South Australia, founded in 1898, thanks largely to the efforts of its first minister, Rev. Charles Manthorpe, who died shortly after its completion. It was known as Manthorpe Memorial Church for over 80 years.

== History ==
=== Parkside Congregational Church ===
On 12 January 1892 the foundation stone was laid by Rev. C. A. Berry of Wolverhampton for a church building on Rugby Terrace, Unley. E. Davies was the architect and J. J. Jackson was the contractor. The first services, on 20 March 1892, were conducted by Revs. W. P. Jones in the morning, F. Hastings in the afternoon, and J. R. Glasson in the evening. A Miss Virgo (no other information found) was the organist. Rev. Charles Manthorpe preached there on occasion 1893–1894. Rev. F. Hastings was offered the pastorate in 1894 but declined. Manthorpe accepted but ill health prevented him from immediately taking the pulpit. The building, which held around 130, soon proved inadequate to house the number of adherents. A request to use the Unley Town Hall for services was rejected by the council on the grounds that such would interfere with activities of the Anglican church nearby.

In 1897 the congregation decided to sell the building and construct something with a capacity of 400 persons. The old building was still standing around 2020,

=== New Parkside Congregational Church ===
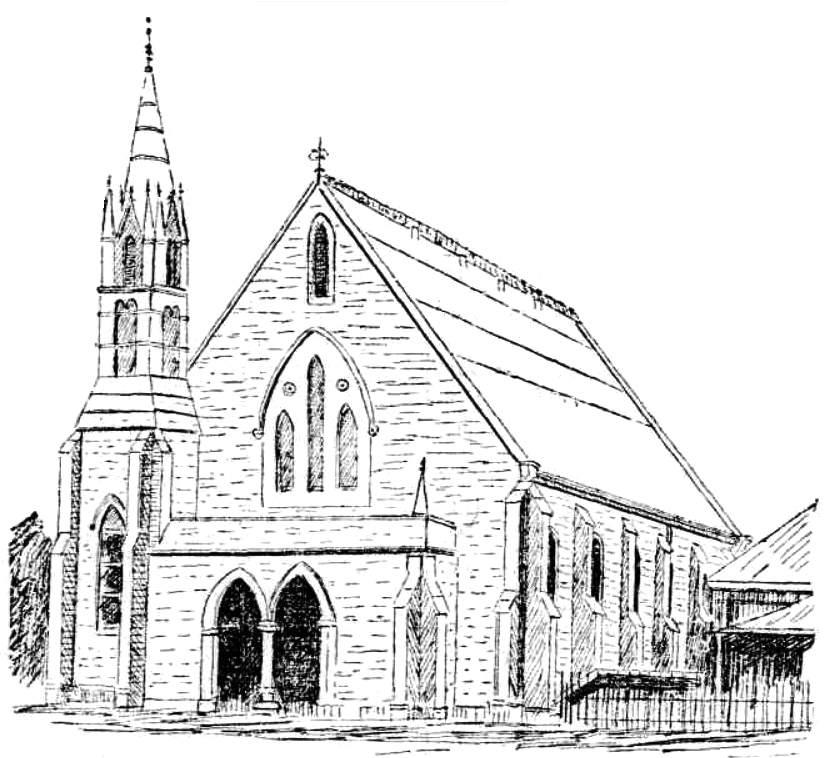
New Parkside Congregational Church 1898

The foundation stone for the New Parkside Congregational Church building at 107 Unley Road, Unley, at the Edmund Street corner, was laid on 21 May 1898 by Mrs S. J. Way, (Note: Samuel James Way (1836–1916) was Chief Justice of the Supreme Court of South Australia from 1876 to 1916. He married the widow Katherine Gollan Blue on 11 April 1898.) and the building opened on 27 November 1898 and divine service was conducted at 11am by Manthorpe and Rev. F. W. Cox. On 4 December he had a seizure and never regained consciousness and died on 6 December. A brief service was held at New Parkside on 8 December before his interment at Brighton Cemetery. On 11 December a memorial service was held at Glenelg for their pastor of over 30 years.

In March 1899 it was resolved to rename the church name of the church to "Manthorpe Memorial" in memory of the man who was largely responsible for having the church built, and who was its first pastor. At the same meeting it was announced that Rev. J. M. Sands, of Hunter's Hill, New South Wales, was to be their new pastor.

In 1977 the Congregational, Methodist and Presbyterian churches combined to form the Uniting Church of Australia, although some individual churches opted to retain their old identities. The Presbyterians of St Andrew's Church, at 2 Hughes Street, Unley, joined with the Manthorpe Congregationalists to form St Andrews Manthorpe Uniting Church, and in 1981 the Hughes Street building was sold.
