= Hamilton Charles Palmer =

Early South Australian lawyer

Hamilton Charles Palmer LLB (died c. 19 January 1880) was a lawyer in the early days of the colony of South Australia, remembered for his year as a master at one of Adelaide's private schools in 1860 and for a bathetic political candidature ten years later.

== History ==
Palmer studied law at the University of London, and was called to the Middle Temple in 1854. He emigrated to South Australia late in 1859 or early 1860, following his brother, the Rev. C. E. Palmer.

Charles Edwin Palmer had arrived from Warrington with his wife Carlotte, née Palin, in 1858 to take charge of the Glenelg Independent Church on the Bay Road, then quickly established the new Glenelg Congregational Church on Jetty Road opposite Nile Street, completed in 1859, and was its first minister. He decided however to leave the Congregational Church for the Church of England, and left for England to be ordained, leaving the Glenelg church without a pastor, a failed Sunday School, a dwindling congregation and a great debt to repay, a situation that was only reversed with the incumbency of Charles Manthorpe. C. E. Palmer was in 1861 ordained curate of Trinity Church, Hartlepool.

It was arranged by John Lorenzo Young, head master of Adelaide Educational Institution that during his extended absence in 1860 Palmer would take his maths classes and the senior class in classics. He was remembered by one student as aloof and disconnected from his pupils, not at all likeable, and with the voice of someone with a perpetual sinus infection. Another remembers him as an object of ridicule and subject of students' pranks.

Between January and May 1860 he wrote a series of articles for the South Australian Register over the pen-name "A Templar":

- Torrens Title
- The Party System
- Early History of Australia
- The Office of Attorney General
- The Late Commissioner of Insolvency

Palmer established a legal practice at Auburn, then in 1863 moved to Kapunda, where he maintained an office for the rest of his life, and had an extensive business for some time. He also maintained an office in the Town Hall Chambers, Adelaide. Henry Charles Hamilton Ayliffe (18 June 1846 – 10 March 1916) was articled clerk to Palmer at the time of his death.

In 1870, following a petition by residents, Palmer agreed to stand for the seat of The Burra at the forthcoming election, but at the poll he was betrayed by his proponents, and received very few votes, the elected candidates being Captain John Hart and Charles Mann. It appeared the urging to join the contest was in the nature of a "lark" or practical joke.

Palmer was found dead in his bed at the Pilot Boat Hotel, Port Pirie, on Monday morning. A coronial inquest determined the cause of death as apoplexy, and not suicide.

Palmer never married and had no children. His brother Rev. Charles Edwin Palmer had one son while in Adelaide.
