= Muriel Chase =

Australian journalist and philanthropist (1880–1936)

Muriel Jean Eliot Chase
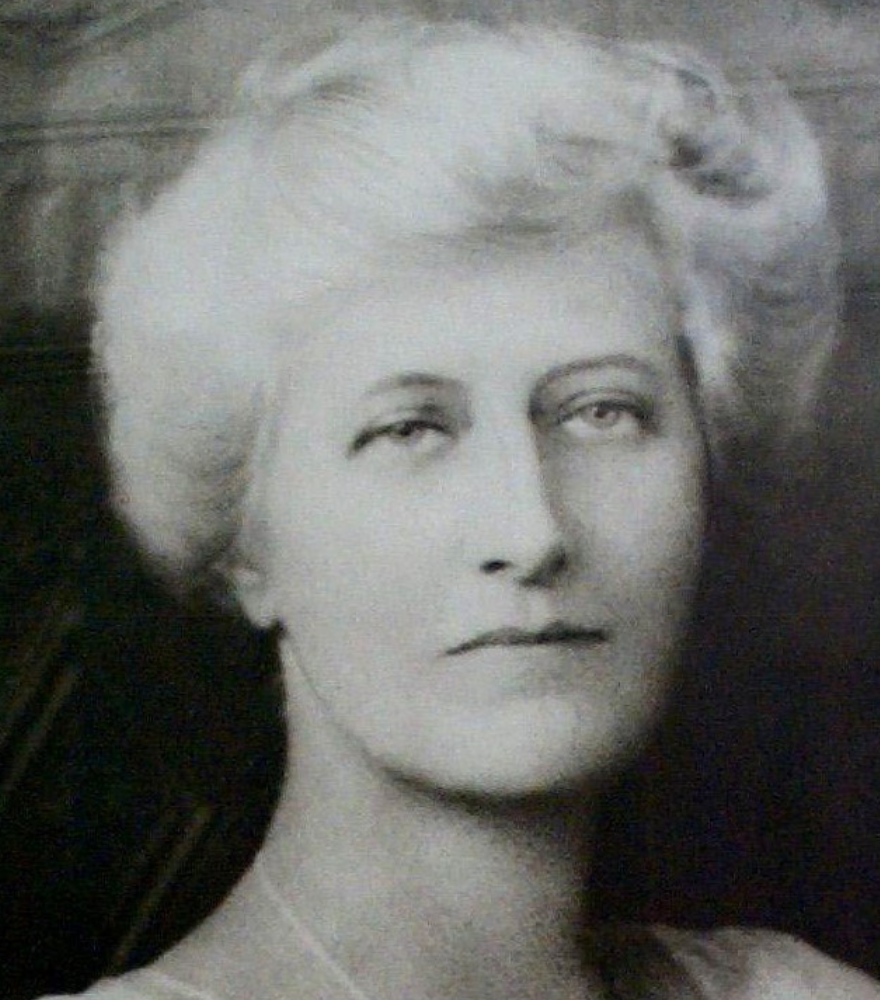
- Born: July 2, 1880; Geraldton
- Died: February 13, 1936 (aged 55)
- Other name: "Aunt Mary"
- Education: Amy Best's school
- Occupation: Journalist
- Employer: Western Mail
- Known for: starting the Silver Chain Nursing League
- Spouse: Ernest Edward Chase
- Children: two daughters

Muriel Jean Eliot Chase born Muriel Jean Eliot Cooper aka Aunt Mary and Adrienne (July 2, 1880 – February 13, 1936) was an Australian Western Mail journalist and philanthropist. She devised the first idea that created the Silver Chain Nursing League.

== Life ==
Chase was born in Geraldton in 1880. Her parents were Priscilla Richenda (born Eliot) and John Henry Cooper. She was the first of their four children.

Chase was educated at Perth's Central High School for Girls, better known as "Amy Best's School". Amy Best was a feminist who campaigned for equal pay and women's suffrage.

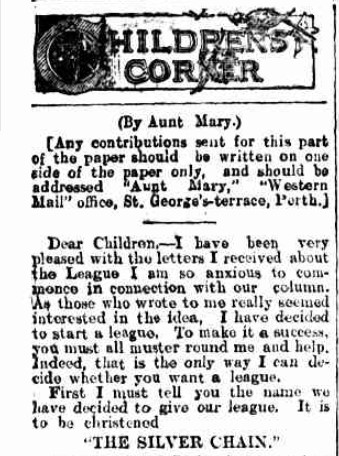
Aunt Mary's Children Corner (by Muriel Chase) 3 June 1905

It was at the invitation of John Winthrop Hackett that Chase became "Aunt Mary" on his Western Mail newspaper. Chase first proposed the idea of silver chain in "Aunt Mary's Children's Corner" in the Western Mail on 3 June 1905. She suggested that her "nieces and nephews" made "silver links" of service to help poorer children in Western Australia. The children paid an annual subscription of a shilling and this funded Christmas presents that year. The idea expanded and it was soon funding its first District Nurse. The first nurse was briefly Sister Copley before Sister Frances Cherry replaced her. Sister Cherry was to help the service and was employed until her death in 1941.

In 1912, Gertrude Mead, who was the third Western Australian woman doctor, joined the committee of the Silver Chain Nursing League and suggested that older people could live in cottage homes. The first of these homes was on Wright Street in North Perth and its interiors were designed by Mead and Chase.

Chase died in 1936. Her funeral took place at St George's Cathedral, where she had married. She was survived by her two daughters. One of the cottage homes for the elderly in Perth is named after her. In 2011 Silverchain and the Royal District Nursing Service in South Australia merged. On International Women's Day Silverchain.org were celebrating her role in creating the service they provide.
