= James Wedlock =

Australian ironmaster

James Wedlock (22 March 1842 – 30 October 1898) was an ironmaster in the early days of Adelaide, South Australia.

== History ==
Wedlock was born in Helston, Cornwall, and served an apprenticeship as a moulder. He emigrated to South Australia in the Lincoln, arriving in Adelaide in December 1865, and found employment at Wallaroo, then at the Victoria Foundry in Hindley Street around 1873, serving as manager under F. C. Belcher, then in 1878 became the owner, renaming it the Cornwall Foundry. He never lost his interest in the workers' welfare; his men were all employed on the eight hours principle; he started the first Labor League in Adelaide, which merged into the Eight Hours Union.

He was for 15 years a member of Adelaide's Fire Brigade, first as a fireman, then in charge of No. 2 reel, and for a time was deputy superintendent. Before he resigned in 1885 he had distinguished himself at several large fires, notably at James Marshall & Co.'s, the East-End Market, the Academy of Music, and Burford & Sons in 1886.

In 1892 he stood, unsuccessfully, for councillor for the Goodwood ward of the Unley Corporation but was defeated by two votes. Then in 1895 he was elected councillor for Gawler ward in the Adelaide City Corporation, and was still on the council when he died.

He was for many years a supporter of the South Adelaide Football Club, a member of the West Adelaide Electorate Cricket Club and the Norwood Cycling Club.

He was a member, and church steward, of the Pirie Street Wesleyan Methodist Church, and helped out with the Sunday-School. He and his brother Edwin Wedlock were among the first members of the Cornish Society.

He died of cancer after a severe illness lasting about four months.

== Family ==
He was married; they had one son, James Percy Wedlock (an employee of J. Colton & Co.) and two daughters, Miss S. Wedlock and Mrs. H. Bellhouse. Another three sons and four daughters predeceased him.
