= Henry Adams (Australian politician) =

Australian politician and trade unionist

Harry Adams
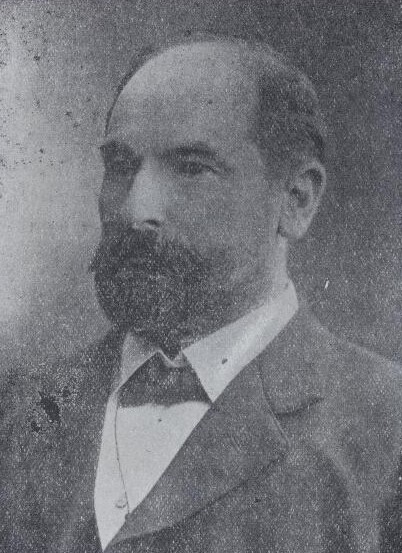

President, United Trades and Labour Council of South Australia
- In office 1893–1894

Member of the South Australian Parliament for Central District No. 1
- In office 12 May 1894 – 2 May 1902

Personal details
- Born: 2 January 1851 Tungkillo, Province of South Australia
- Died: 7 June 1926 (aged 75) Prospect, South Australia, South Australia
- Party: United Labor Party
- Spouse: Ellen Eddy
- Children: 2
- Profession: Miner, Politician & Trade Unionist
- Website: SA Parliament Biography

Henry (Harry) Adams (1851 – 7 June 1926) was an Australian politician and trade unionist. He was a United Labor Party member of the South Australian Legislative Council from 1894 to 1902, representing Central District. He also served as president of the United Trades and Labour Council of South Australia and was a long-serving secretary of the Railways Service Association.

== Early life ==
Adams was born in Tungkillo, South Australia, elder son of Henry Adams Sr., and soon after moved with his parents to a farm in Mount Barker. His father found work at the Callington mine.

== Mining career ==
At age 14 Henry left school to work at the same mine. In 1870, when the mine became uneconomic, he left Callington for Moonta. In 1878 he left to work as a carpenter for coachbuilder John Crimp, in Grenfell Street, Adelaide. A year later he went to work for the builder Nicholas W. Trudgen, also of Grenfell Street. He next joined the Government Way and Works Department, and rose to the position of engineer. When the Department shifted to Glanville he was transferred as patternmaker.

== Political and Union Career ==
He was involved in the Union movement, and in 1893 left the job to contest the seat of Sturt on the House of Assembly for the Labor Party. He was beaten, but was elected president of the Trades and Labor council, then in 1894 won a seat on the Legislative Council, and retired in 1902, and taking up residence in Devonport Terrace, Wayville.

He was associated with the Railways Service Association, and for many years was secretary. He was for 28 years a director of the Co-operative Building Society and treasurer of the Adelaide Cooperative Society. He was a longtime member of the Pirie Street Methodist Church, on the Council of the School of Mines, and the Board of Elder Homes. He was a former Secretary of the Amalgamated Railways Association. He was for twenty years a trustee of the Savings Bank of South Australia.

== Personal life ==
At 18 years of age he began preaching at the Mount Barker Methodist Church circuit, but resisted suggestions that he make the Church his vocation.

Adams had a brother in Broken Hill and three sisters.

He was married with two sons Henry Gordon Adams and Victor E. Adams, and a daughter, Mrs. Lattimore; he died at 4 Audley Avenue, Prospect, the home of his son H. G. Adams, and was buried at West Terrace Cemetery.
