= George Wilcox & Co =

South Australian hide and wool business

George Wilcox & Co. was a South Australian hide and wool business, which in 1917 became Wilcox Mofflin Ltd.

== History ==
George Wilcox (3 October 1838 – 5 September 1917) was born in St Neots, Huntingdonshire, England, a son of master tailor and draper Joseph Wilcox, sen. He emigrated to South Australia, travelling to Melbourne by steamer SS Great Britain then arriving by coaster Admella in Adelaide in early 1859; his brother Joseph had emigrated in 1856 to join William Barker as a business partner. Soon after arriving, George opened a drapery and general store in Gawler as J. & G. Wilcox 1862–1872 with his father Joseph Wilcox handling the London end of the business. He also dealt in honey, beeswax, gum, bark, tallow and, later, wool.

Joseph Wilcox, William Barker and George Wilcox traded in Gawler as Wilcox, Barker and Wilcox 1861–1862 then as J & G Wilcox 1862–1872. Joseph, sen., acted as London agent for some or all of this time. The drapery business was bought out by Joseph Wilcox & Co. in April 1872; Joseph Wilcox & Co. took over the Gawler produce store in October 1872. Joseph Wilcox & Co. became J. & J. Wilcox that same year. Joseph would later sell his business to Edward Lucas, with partners Hunt and Corry. William Barker (c. 1817 – 29 August 1890) and George's brother Emery Wilcox traded as Barker and Wilcox in Gawler 1862–1864. Barker purchased Thomas Good's business at Mount Barker, and Emery Wilcox, whose fondness for alcohol made him unreliable, took to the roads as a hawker.

In 1864, George returned to England, where he married Annie Fuller (or Fuller Caldecot) of Eynesbury, and returned to South Australia that same year by the City of Adelaide on her first voyage to the antipodes.

In 1874 George moved to Adelaide, where he set up a business dealing in wool, hides, skins and other produce, and soon had branches in other States. He was in 1882 appointed general manager of the Apollo Soap and Stearine's new Thebarton factory, which however closed after a few years, then in 1887 was taken over by W. H. Burford & Sons.

Sidney Wilcox began working for his father around 1880, and in 1889 was, with G. Glen Legoe, brought into the business as a partner. They founded a Sydney business operating at 136 Kent Street with local partners Henry Samuel Rickards and Frederick William Kugelmann, dissolved in November 1889.

In January 1894 George retired, though maintaining an interest in the business until his last years, and brothers George Seaborn Wilcox and Murray Wilcox joined Sidney Wilcox and Legoe, retaining the business name of George Wilcox & Co.

In 1917 George Wilcox & Co. and Mofflin & Co. of Sydney combined to become Wilcox, Mofflin Limited, with Murray Wilcox as the founding chairman of directors. Other directors were Sidney Wilcox, Legoe, L. M. Triggs, G. G. C. Millard and G. P. Sayers.

== Family ==
Four sons of Joseph Wilcox (1811–1894) and Sarah Wilcox, née Emery (1813–1891 ):

- Thomas Wilcox ( – November 1910) draper of Gawler with William Barker, then Rundle Street (later Craven & Armstrong opposite York Hotel), then Brunswick, Victoria; He married Priscilla Heydon before leaving for Australia. left widow and family in Victoria.
- George Wilcox (3 October 1838 – 5 September 1917) married Ann "Annie" Fuller Caldecot (c. May 1840 – 13 April 1897) on 20 July 1864 They had a residence "Eynesbury" in Mitcham, of which a magnificent wisteria was a notable feature. Their children included:

- Edith Wilcox (12 May 1865 – ) married Henry Edward McRostie in 1890
- Sidney Wilcox (25 August 1866 – 31 January 1942) was born in Mitcham and educated at J. L. Young's Adelaide Educational Institution. (Note: The Wilcox and Legoe boys were not mentioned in newspaper reports of the school's prizegivings and reunions, nor in Diana Chessell's Adelaide's Dissenting Headmaster, Wakefield Press 2014 ISBN 978 1 74305 240 2) Apart from his involvement with the family business, he had from around 1928 interests in pastoral properties Brenda Park, near Morgan. He followed his father as partner with William Hamilton, then with his son A. E. Hamilton in the firm of Hamilton & Wilcox (liquidated 1928), which operated Koonamore Station, north-east of Orroroo, now a University of Adelaide research station. He remained a director until his retirement in 1938. Following an approach by Violet Plummer, he contributed in 1940 £5,000 to the University of Adelaide towards foundation of a women's college. He never married.
- Nellie Wilcox (24 December 1867 – 1950)
- George Seaborn Wilcox (30 January 1873 – 14 July 1915) was born at sea aboard the clipper City of Adelaide. He married Constance Navena Welman ( –1932) in August 1899, lived at Darling Point, New South Wales, suicide by gunshot.
- Murray Wilcox (10 November 1874 – ) married cousin Eva Marie Wilcox (8 July 1879 – ) in 1899.

- Emery Wilcox ( b. 1840 St Neots) married Caroline Elizabeth Fairey September 1863 in St Neots. Immigration 24 July 1859 "Red Jacket" unassisted to Melbourne. Lived in Gawler Moved to Sydney 6/4/1869 (steerage on the Bengal) unreliable drunk. Sentenced to 6 months in Darlinghurst Gaol 10 February 1876. April 1875 apprehended for protection, was ordered to be sent to the receiving house for lunatics. changed his name, may have died in South Africa. Wife changed her name to hide from him.
- Joseph Wilcox (c. 1844 – 19 July 1918) arrived in South Australia c. 1856 aged 12, lived in Gawler until 1889, married to Eliza Wilcox née Mayfield (c. 1850 – 24 June 1937). He was employee of G. & R. Wills & Co.

- Eva Marie Wilcox (8 July 1879 – ) married cousin Murray Wilcox in 1899.

== Similar businesses in early South Australia ==
- Peacock & Son William Peacock 1839 fellmonger in Adam Street, Hindmarsh then also tanner at Thebarton
- Dench & Co.
- Bean Brothers
- Michell & Sons wool scourers and brokers
