= William Goldsack =

William Goldsack (1871–1957) was an Australian Baptist Missionary Society missionary to East Bengal (present day Bangladesh), India.

He authored several books, like Christ in Islam, Muhammad in Islam, and chiefly notable for undertaking the translation of Quran, also spelled Koran, into Bengali language.

== Missionary work ==
Goldsack joined the Australian Baptist Missionary Society in 1899, where he mastered languages before being placed at mission station Pabna, East Bengal. At Pabna, he devoted his missionary work to preaching and teaching; additionally, he purchased the land for mission to erect new Zenana house. Having been influenced by George Henry Rouse, head of the Baptist Mission Press at Calcutta, West Bengal, he devoted himself to the Islamic studies and literary work; thus, he wrote many apologetic tracts and pamphlets and produced a translation of the Four Gospels in Muslim Bengali in 1912. From 1908 to 1915, he undertook the translation of Quran or Koran into Bengali language.

In 1911, having attended the Lucknow Conference of Missionaries to Muslims, he was elected to the continuation committee. Between 1917 and 1918, he learnt Arabic language at missionary stations in Syria for six months, and later six months in Cairo, Egypt. Not being comfortable with district duties of Australian Baptist Missionary Society, he got himself transferred to British Baptist Missionary Society in 1912, during his furlough.

British Baptist Missionary Society designated his services exclusively for Muslim work in 1914. While serving as the editor of the Christian Literature Society of Bengal branch, he rendered the Quran into the Bengali language in portions from 1908 to 1915. This was now published as a complete volume in 1920. He also translated a translation of Pfander's Mizan al-Haqq which was published in 1917, a collection of Muslim traditions (Islami Hadith) in 1919, The Bible in Islam in 1922 and other works. Perhaps his most enduring contribution was a Musselmani Bangal-English Dictionary published by CLS in 1923. Many religious scholars, do believe that his was a bold and strategic venture on literary lines, and also had great effect on intelligent Moslems - the Koran he produced had Christian comments along with explanation of difficult passages, seemingly to avoid mis-interpretations and lead Moslems to Christ.

He remained Christian all his life, although devoted all his missionary work in Islamic studies and literature for evangelizing Bengali Muslims. He retired from missionary service in 1923, due to Malaria and recurrent boils; later part of his life was spent in fruit farming in South Australia, along with his family.

== Criticism ==
Bhai Girish Chandra Sen, member of Brahmo Samaj, was the first non-Muslim to translate the whole Quran into Bengaliin 1886; however, his translation did not contain any Arabic text, instead it had Bengali words. For instance, Allah has been translated as ISHSHAR, Jannah as SHORGO, Jahannam as NOROK, Ibadah as ARCHONA, and alike. Goldsack, by contrast, had studied Urdu, Arabic and Persian and had made notes as to which loanwords had become part of Muslim Bengali. He, therefore, introduced these to make his translation more acceptable to Muslim readers.

Goldsack's translation of the Qur'an into Bengali also included many footnotes. These were denounced as offensive to Muslims and his translation, amongst many others, was proscribed by the new country of (East) Pakistan. Although Goldsack's translation seems to have been rejected by Muslims on account of its footnotes, it did influence many vernacular translations that followed it.

== Works ==
- Christ in Islam, 1905.
- The Quraan in Islam, 1906.
- Muhammed in Islam, 1916.
- The Bible in Islam, 1922.
- A Mussalmani Bengali-English Dictionary (with Sila Basak)
- Muhammad and the Bible
- Selections from Muhammadan Traditions
- Ghulam Jabbar's Renunciation: A Tale of Eastern Bengal.
- The Origins of the Qur'an.
