= Violet Plummer =

South Australian medical doctor (1873–1962)

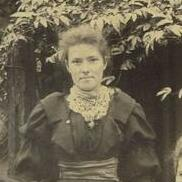
- Born: Violet May Plummer; 8 July 1873; Camperdown, New South Wales
- Died: 17 June 1962 (aged 88)
- Occupation: Medical doctor
- Known for: First woman General Practitioner in Adelaide

Violet May Plummer (8 July 1873 – 17 June 1962) was a South Australian medical doctor, one of the first women from the University of Adelaide to graduate in medicine, [the first was Laura Margaret Hope née Fowler] and in 1900 was the first woman General Practitioner to practise in Adelaide.

== Early life and education ==
Violet May Plummer was born in Camperdown, New South Wales,Australia, on 8 July 1873. Her parents were the schoolmaster Isaac Arthur Plummer (1848–1905) and his wife Eleanor Alice Plummer, née Newland ( –1927), who married in January 1869. In 1878, they moved to Wallaroo, South Australia, where Isaac had secured an appointment as headmaster, then later that year, at his request, transferred to Wallaroo Bay. He was moved to Gawler in 1880, Lefevre's Peninsula in 1887, and Norwood in 1889, before being appointed Inspector of Schools in 1891. He was an enthusiastic member of the South Australian Volunteer Military Force, with the rank of Major. Among her siblings were nurse Muriel Effie Plummer ( –1950) who married Frank Sykes Scholefield in 1909; and youngest brother Dr. Rex Garnet Plummer ( –1971) who married Marion Grose in 1913.

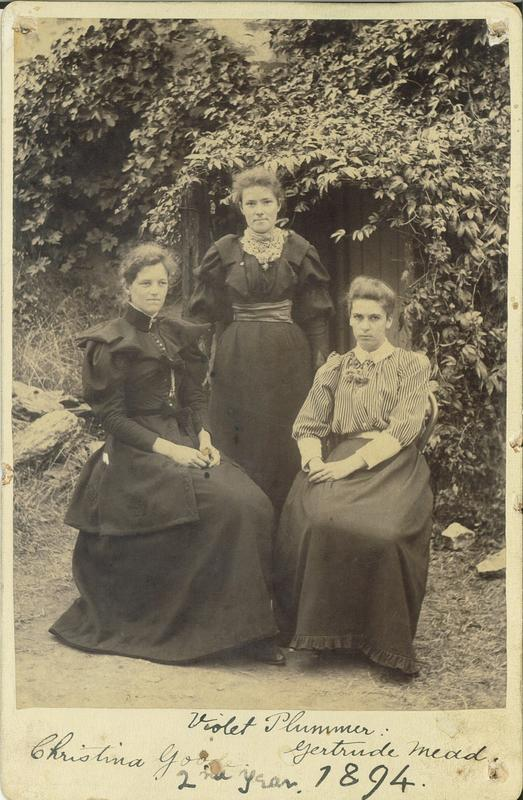
2nd year medical students in 1894, Christina Goode (1874 -1951), Plummer and Gertrude Mead

In 1881, the University of Adelaide had been the first Australian university to admit women to academic courses, but there were no facilities for country or interstate women students comparable to St. Mark's residential college. Plummer began studies at the Advanced School for Girls in 1887 after winning a bursary, and matriculated in 1890. She gained her BSc. at the University of Adelaide in 1893 and passed her first year's medicine subjects the same year. However, she and her two fellow female medical students, Gertrude Mead and Christina L. Goode, had to defend themselves against claims of impropriety - in particular, Mead wrote in letters to the newspapers, that they had "on no occasion examined any pateint after 5 p.m." Their cohort left for Melbourne in 1897 to complete the requirements for the Bachelor of Medicine rather than at Adelaide Hospital, which was a notoriously toxic workplace. A notable fellow student following the same trajectory was Frederic John Chapple, and it was possibly through this connection that she was to meet his sister Phoebe Chapple, (though they both attended the Advanced School) whom she would encourage to study medicine, and with whom she would enjoy a lifelong friendship and professional relationship. Both she and Frederic achieved second class passes.

== Career ==
In 1898, she was appointed resident surgeon of the Melbourne Hospital then in 1899 resident surgeon in the infirmary department of the Woman's Hospital, Melbourne.

In the 1930s, a group of women graduates, which included Plummer, Dr. Helen Mayo, Dr. Constance Finlayson, and Pauline Grenfell Price, met to solve the longstanding problem of accommodation for country and interstate female students. After being approached by Plummer, Sidney Wilcox (1866–1942) of the wool brokers Wilcox, Mofflin, gave £5000 and bequeathed his house on Brougham Place, North Adelaide to the university so that a residential college for women might be established. St. Ann's College was officially opened with sixteen residential students in 1947, much of the delay being attributable to the War.

== Personal life ==
Her residence until 1927 was on North Terrace, two doors east of Charles Street, a two-storey property, the upper floor of which for a time served as the home of the Adelaide Lyceum Club, of which she was a longtime member. The building was advertised for sale in 1927, and the club moved to 200 North Terrace, but in 1962 she was still living at that address, which also contained the consulting rooms of her brother Dr. R. G. Plummer and her nephew Alexander Philip Plummer, dental surgeon.

Plummer never married. She died on 17 June 1962.
