= Baptist Mission Australia =

Christian missionary society in Australia

- Formation: 1864
- Type: Mission Organisation
- Headquarters: Melbourne, Australia
- Executive Director: Scott Pilgrim
- Website: Official website

Baptist Mission Australia, formerly Global Interaction, the Australian Baptist Missionary Society, and originally the Australian Baptist Foreign Mission, is a Christian missionary society founded by Baptists in Australia in 1864. The national office is in Melbourne.

== History ==
Australian Baptists had been sending money to the Baptist Missionary Society in London as their expression of interest in mission. The South Australian Baptist Missionary Society was founded at Flinders Street Baptist Church on 10 November 1864 under Rev Silas Mead, and the first missionaries, Ellen Arnold and Marie Gilbert, were sent to East Bengal in 1882. Arnold returned to Australia in 1884 suffering illness and undertook a tour of the colonies and New Zealand which became known as the "crusade of Ellen Arnold." This led to the establishment of the Queensland and New Zealand Baptist Missionary Societies. Four other young women decided to join her (becoming known as the "five barley loaves") in East Bengal, which then became the primary mission field for Australian Baptists. Between 1882 and 1913, the colonial societies sent fifty-four women and sixteen men to Bengal, including Mead's son Dr Cecil Mead and his wife Alice. The women visited Indian women in their zenanas. The work of the mission was almost solely focused in India for 80 years. Wilton Hack, a South Australian Baptist pastor, had raised private funds to go to Japan in 1874, not wanting to take money prioritised to the work in Faridpur.

The various state missionary societies federated in 1913 as the Australian Baptist Mission. It was renamed the Australian Baptist Missionary Society in 1959 and then Global Interaction in 2002.

Work in Papua New Guinea began in 1949, at the urging of returned World War II chaplains, with focus on Bible translation as well as health and education. By 1995 the Baptist Union of Papua New Guinea had 35,000 members.

Workers were later sent to Papua and Timor, and then to Zambia and Zimbabwe, later moving to Malawi and Mozambique. More recent locations include Thailand in 1972, Cambodia, and Kazakhstan. In many locations, the goal has been to develop the indigenous church and work towards handover.

Baptist missionary services to Aboriginal communities in Central Australia began in 1947 under the Australian Baptist Federal Home Mission Board. This became part of ABMS in the 1970s.

As of 2013, Global Interaction had 123 missionaries working in 17 different regions.

The mission has produced a magazine called Vision since 1950. They have also published papers and biographies by a number of their missionaries.

In November 2021, Global Interaction changed its name to Baptist Mission Australia.

== Notable workers ==
- Ellen Arnold
- William Goldsack
