= Pilgrim Uniting Church =

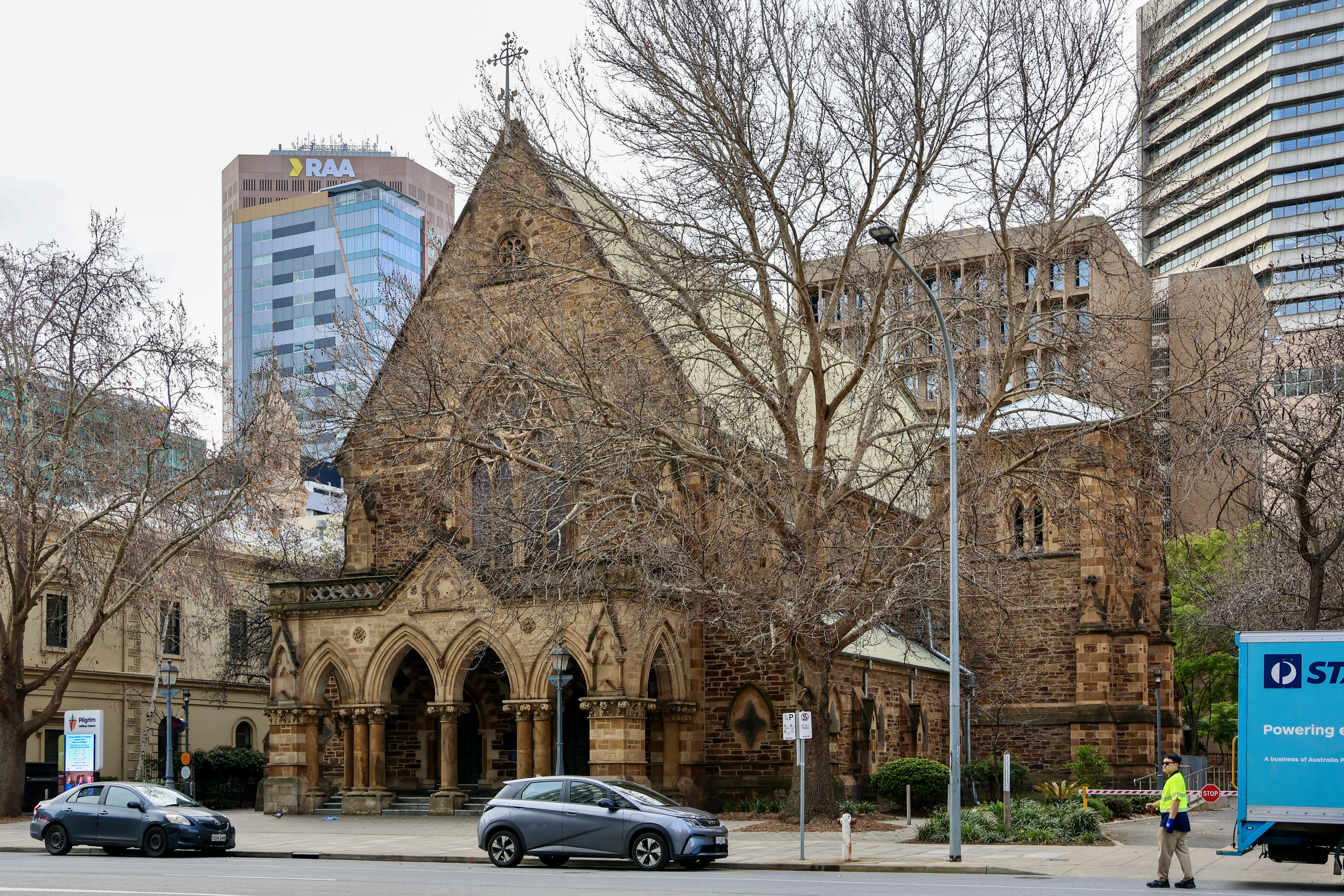
- The church in 2026
- Pilgrim Uniting Church
- 34°55′37″S 138°36′03″E
- Address: 2–10 Flinders Street, Adelaide, South Australia
- Denomination: Uniting (since 1977)
- Previous denomination: Congregational (1865 – 1977)
- Website: pilgrim.org.au

History
- Former names: Stow Memorial Church; Union Church in the City
- Status: Church
- Founded: 7 February 1865
- Dedication: Rev. Thomas Quinton Stow
- Dedicated: 12 April 1867

Architecture
- Functional status: Active
- Architect: Robert George Thomas
- Architectural type: Church
- Style: Gothic Revival

Specifications
- Capacity: 1,500
- Materials: Glen Osmond stone

South Australian Heritage Register
- Official name: Pilgrim Uniting (former Stow Memorial Church)
- Designated: 14 February 1985
- Reference no.: 10983

Pilgrim Uniting Church is a Uniting church located on Flinders Street, Adelaide in South Australia.

Social justice, as articulated by the Uniting Church in Australia in the inaugural Statement to the Nation (1977), and the Statement to the Nation (1988) for Australia's Bicentennial celebrations, is at the basis of the church's work. Pilgrim offers music programs to the public, and has the largest organ in Adelaide.

== History ==
=== Pirie Street Wesleyan Church ===
The congregation was originally at the Gawler Place Wesleyan Chapel. The first minister at the Pirie Street site was Daniel Draper. The first service was held on 19 October 1852.

William Bowen Chinner was organist and choirmaster at Pirie Street from 1869 to around 1899. His nephew Norman Chinner filled the same positions from 1939.

=== Stow Memorial Church ===
The first Congregational chapel in South Australia was a temporary structure on North Terrace. George Strickland Kingston was the architect for a building in Freeman Street (now Gawler Place), with the congregation then moving to the Flinders Street site.

Stow Memorial Church, at 12 Flinders Street, Adelaide, was named in memory of the Reverend Thomas Quinton Stow, who had officiated at the first service in a tent on Adelaide's Park Lands in October 1837. The foundation stone was laid on 7 February 1865 and the inaugural worship service was held on 12 April 1867. The first minister was Cadwallader William Evan. The organist, who served for 45 years, was James Shakespeare.

=== Union Church in the City ===
Pirie Street Methodist and Stow Memorial congregations united on 1 June 1969 to form the Union Church in the City. In November 1975 the church changed its name to become Pilgrim Church. The congregation joined the Uniting Church at its inauguration in 1977.

== Buildings ==
=== Pirie Street ===
The foundation stone for the Pirie Street Wesleyan Chapel was laid on 15 July 1850. The church was designed by Henry Stuckey. Completion of the building, after Henry Stuckey's death in 1851, was under the supervision of Edmund Wright.

After the merger of the two congregations the building was bought by the Adelaide City Council and demolished in 1976. Wright was also the architect of the Methodist Meeting Hall, located between the Pirie Street and Flinders Street churches. The hall was built in 1862 and is the only remaining part of the Pirie Street property and is now part of the Adelaide Town Hall complex.

=== Flinders Street ===
The foundation stone of Stow Memorial Church, at 12 Flinders Street, Adelaide, was laid on 7 February 1865. It was designed in the Gothic Revival style by Robert George Thomas, who was among the first colonists, arriving in South Australia in 1836 aged 16 years.

Stow Hall, built 1872 alongside at 16 Flinders Street, has been a popular venue for amateur theatre productions.

== Organs ==
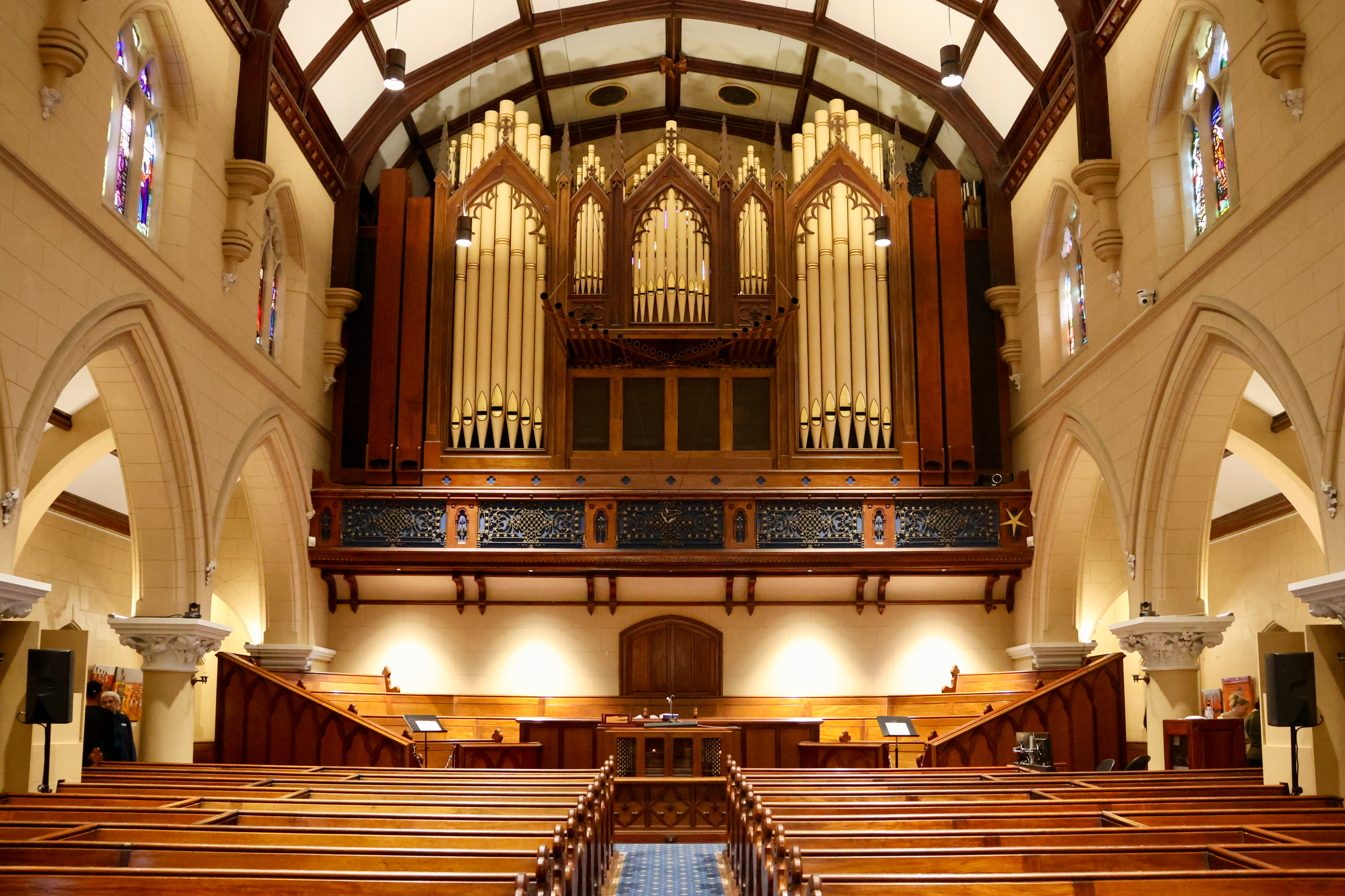
The organ in May 2026

The organ in the Flinders Street building was initially installed in 1855 in the Pirie Street building with that from Flinders Street being sold to St John's Lutheran Church in Malvern. Improvements over the years have made it the largest organ in the state of South Australia.

== Notable people ==
=== Pirie Street Methodist Church ===
- Henry Adams
- John and Mary Colton
- John Langdon Bonython
- Daniel Draper
- Benjamin Gould
- Frank Hambly
- John Hill
- Henry Howard (minister 1902–1921)
- James Wedlock

=== Stow Memorial Church ===
- Mostyn Evan
- William Roby Fletcher, minister, appointed 1876
- Matthew Goode
- William Muirden
- William Parkin
- Arthur William Piper
- James Zimri Sellar
- Thomas Hyland Smeaton
- Alfred Depledge Sykes, minister 1904–1906 and 1907–1913
- Charles Todd
- George Wright (1917–1975), a judge of the Supreme Court of Western Australia, was the son of the Reverend George H. Wright, a minister at the Stow Memorial Church

=== Pilgrim Uniting Church ===
- Judith Blake
- Thea Gaia
- Basil Hetzel
- Penny Wong

== Laneway renaming ==
In August 2022, the City of Adelaide renamed the laneway adjacent to the church, formerly Pilgrim Lane, to Paul Kelly Lane, after Paul Kelly, a well-known musician who grew up in Norwood. This was the fourth such renaming by the council, to honour musicians associated with the city.

== Gallery ==
Church buildings relating to the Pilgrim Uniting Church congregation
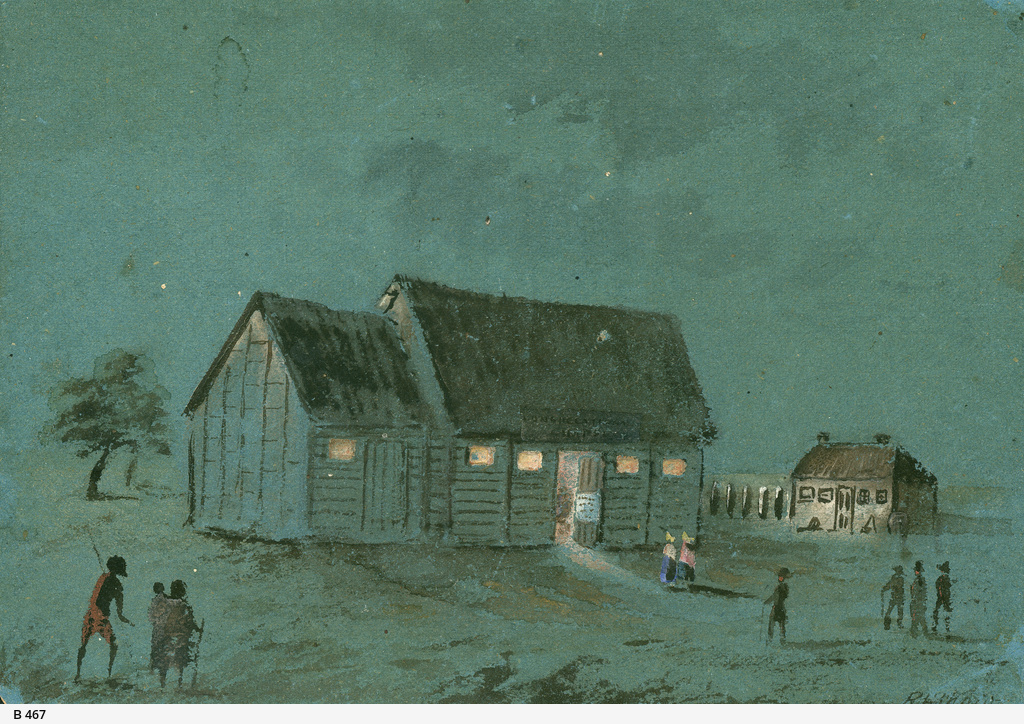
The first Congregational chapel in South Australia (building on right) SLSA B-467

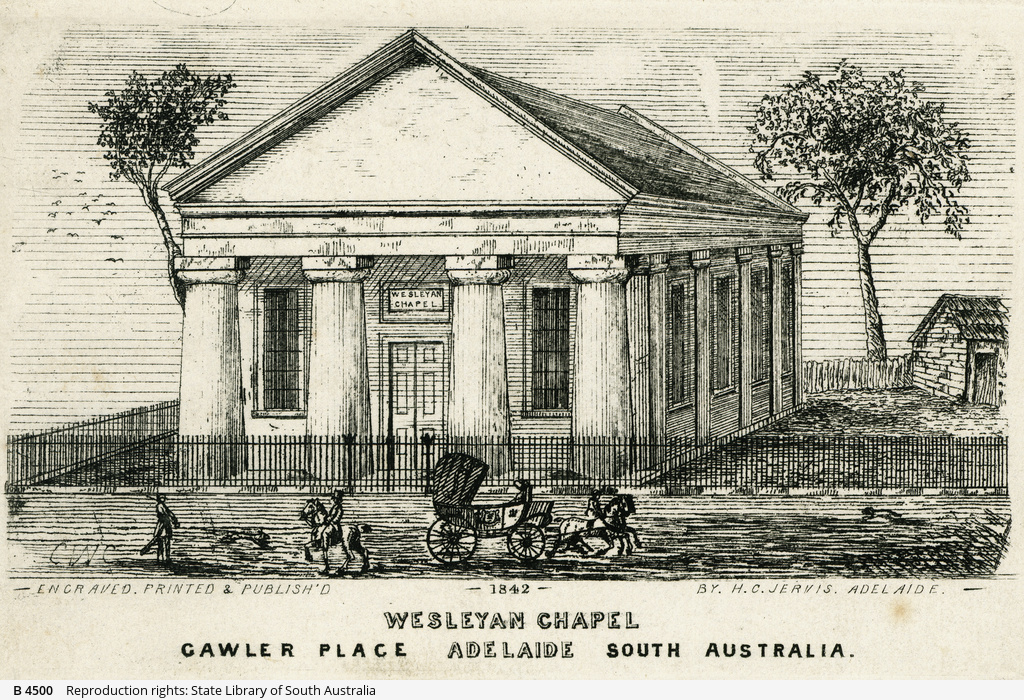
Gawler Place Wesleyan Chapel Engraving from a work by C. W. Calvert 1842 SLSA B-4500

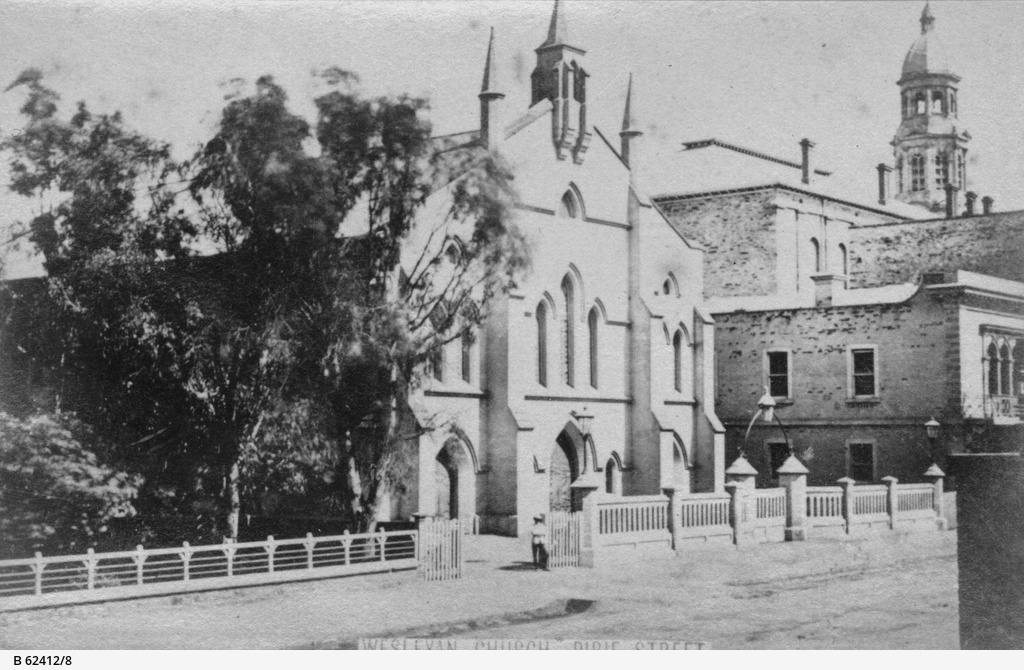
View of the Wesleyan church in Pirie Street, Adelaide, demolished in 1976 SLSA B 62412-8

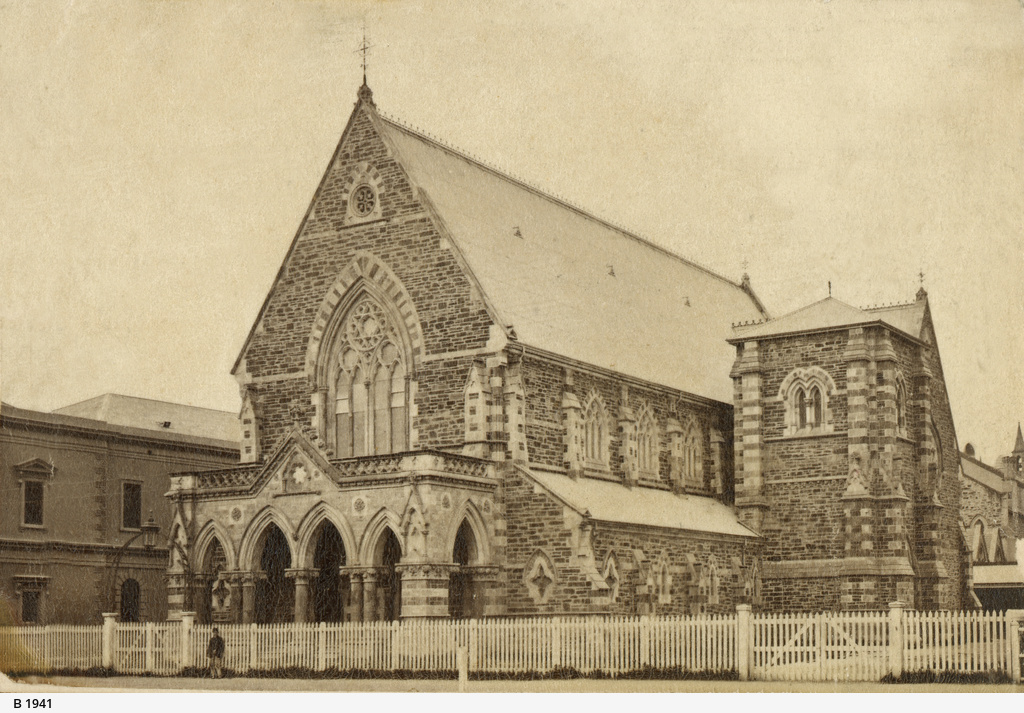
Stow Memorial Church (now Pilgrim Church), Flinders Street, Adelaide, about 1870 SLSA B 1941
