= Lilian Staple Mead =

Australian suffragette and children's author

- Born: 30 June 1865; Adelaide, South Australia
- Died: 27 November 1936 (aged 71); Newton Abbot, England
- Education: Advanced School for Girls; Prince Alfred College; University of Adelaide
- Occupations: Suffragette; Children's author
- Known for: Women's suffrage activism; children's literature
- Spouse: Crosbie Brown
- Children: 1
- Family: Silas Mead (father); Gertrude Mead (sister)

Lilian Staple Mead (30 June 1865 – 27 November 1936) was an Australian suffragette and children's book author. She was the only female student ever educated at Adelaide's Prince Alfred College.

== Early life and education ==
Lilian Staple Mead was born on 30 June 1865, the eldest child of Baptist minister Silas Mead and Ann (née Staple). Her mother died when she was nine. From age 13, she attended the Advanced School for Girls along with her sister Gertrude, completing classes in English Literature at the University of Adelaide in 1882, before moving to Prince Alfred College in 1883–1884 to complete her matriculation, where she was the only female student at the time and since. She commenced a Bachelor of Arts at Adelaide University, but withdrew after the death of her stepmother in 1886 to care for her father.

== Career ==
Mead was a signatory on the South Australian Women's Suffrage Petition in 1894, which is acknowledged by the UNESCO Memory of the World Programme as an Archival treasure. In 1895, Mead gave an address title "The Awakened Woman" at the South Australian Woman's Christian Temperance Union state convention calling for equal education opportunities. She said,

'Why', the awakened woman asked, 'if the intellectually accomplished man is not unmanly, is an intellectually accomplished woman unwomanly? Elizabeth Barrett Browning and Mary Somerville answered the question. Both highly intellectual women, both ideal wives and mothers, both occupying prominent and public positions, they were intensely and undeniably womanly. The awakened woman ... rightly reasoned that if even a moth does not exist only to subserve another's gain, much less does a woman.

Mead was a leader alongside her father in Christian Endeavour and in 1897 gave an address at the society's international convention in California called "The World's Prayer Chain" in which she called for prayers for, among other things, the downfall of caste in India and the abolishment of foot-binding in China.

Mead authored two children's fiction books, A Brother's Need and Patsie's Bricks, which was called by one reviewer "far superior to the general run of books for children." Her third book, Daring and Doing, was a collection of short stories of heroism, based upon true stories and "intended to inspire young readers to similar acts of unselfish devotion." She also had short stories published in The Quiver, a Christian magazine.

== Personal life ==
Mead married Crosbie Brown, a tutor at the East London Missionary Training Institute, Harley House, who was also the child of a minister, on 16 August 1900 at the Baptist Church in Isle Abbots, Somerset and after honeymooning in Switzerland, they lived in London. They had one son, Roger Crosbie Brown, in 1902 in Bourneville. She remained in Britain for the rest of her life.

== Death and legacy ==
Mead died on 27 November 1936 in Newton Abbot. In 2019, to mark 125 years since the South Australian Parliament passed the Adult Suffrage Act, the first in the world to grant women the right to stand for parliament, Mead was one of about 50 women celebrated on banners at the University of Adelaide.

== Books ==
- Mead, Lilian Staple (1903). A Brother's Need. SW Partridge & Co.
- Mead, Lilian Staple (1905). Patsie's Bricks. SW Partridge & Co.
- Mead, Lilian Staple (1912). Daring and Doing: True Stories of Brave Deeds.
