= Torrens (clipper ship) =

English clipper ship

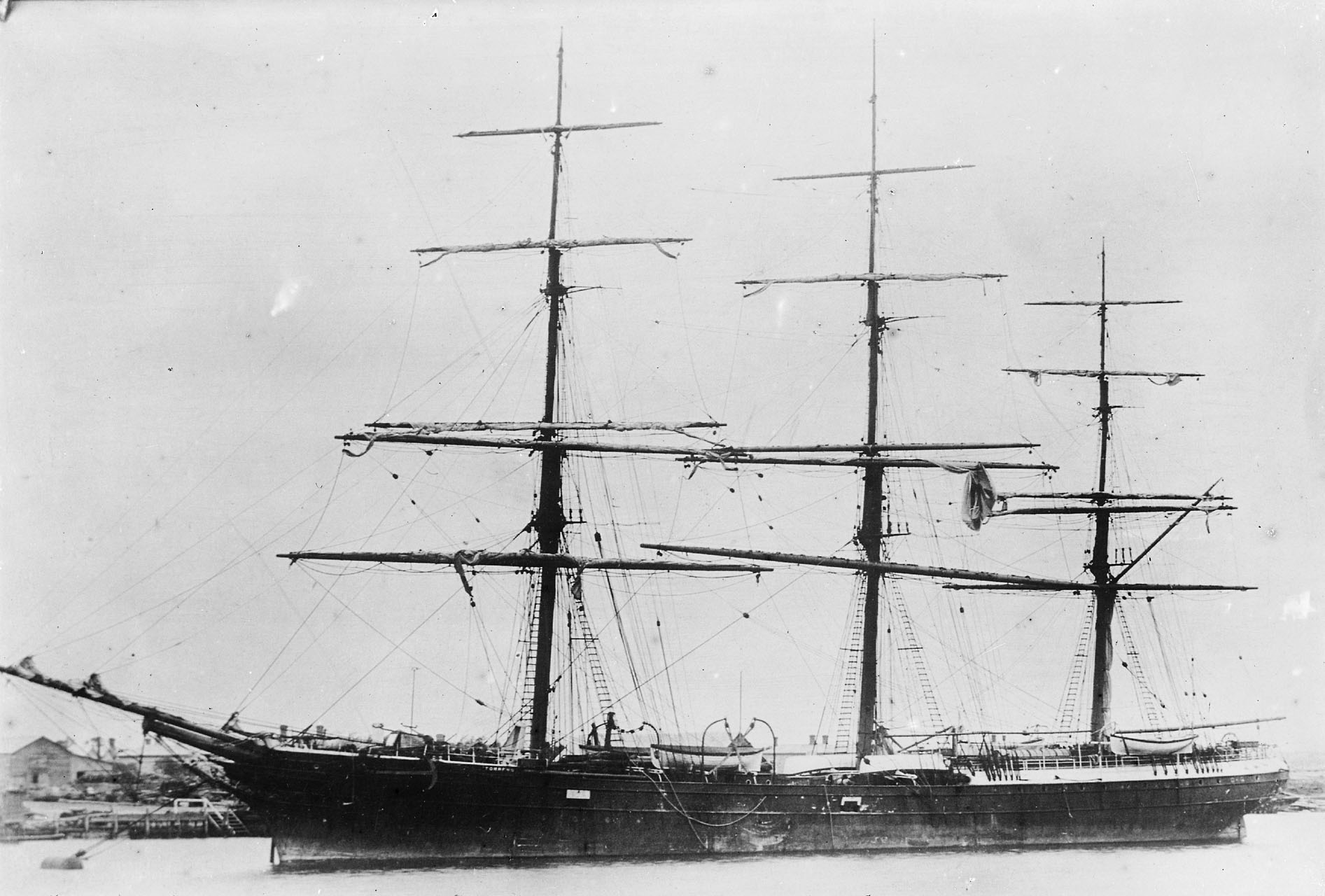
- Torrens in 1875

History
- Name: Torrens
- Namesake: Robert Torrens
- Owner: 1875: Captain HR Angel and others; 1906: G. Mortola fuG.B.
- Operator: 1875: Elder, Smith & Co
- Port of registry: 1875: (United Kingdom of Great Britain and Ireland) London; 1906: (Kingdom of Italy) Genoa
- Builder: Sir James Laing, Sunderland
- Cost: £27,257
- Yard number: 371
- Launched: 30 October 1875
- Completed: 24 November 1875
- Identification: UK official number 73595; code letters WTJL
- Fate: Scrapped in Genoa, 1910

General characteristics
- Type: passenger clipper
- Tonnage: 1,335 GRT, 1,276 NRT
- Length: 222.1 ft (67.7 m)
- Beam: 38.1 ft (11.6 m)
- Draught: 21.5 ft (6.6 m)
- Sail plan: full-rigged ship
- Notes: 1st and 2nd class cabins only

Torrens was a three-masted clipper ship that was built in England in 1875 and scrapped in Italy in 1910. She was designed to carry passengers and cargo between London and Port Adelaide, South Australia, and was the fastest ship to sail on that route. She is notable as the last sailing ship on which Joseph Conrad served before he began his writing career.

== Building ==
James Laing built Torrens for £27,257 at his Deptford shipyard in Sunderland, largely to the specifications of Captain Henry Robert Angel (1829 – June 1923). She was jointly owned by Angel and the Elder Line, but Angel was her major owner.

Torrens was a composite ship, with a steel framed and teak planks. Her registered length was 222.1 feet (67.7 m), her beam was 38.1 feet (11.6 m) and her depth was 21.5 feet (6.6 m). Her tonnages were 1,335 GRT and 1,276 NRT. Her three masts were "heavily sparred and carried a main sky sail yard, and for many years she was the only vessel with studding sail booms running in the Australian trade".

Torrens was launched on 30 October 1875 and completed on 24 November. Captain Angel's elder daughter, (Emily) Flores Angel (1856–1948), performed the traditional breaking of the bottle at the launching ceremony. Her figurehead was modelled on Flores, and carved by Joseph Melvin.

It is likely that she was named after Colonel Robert Torrens, a principal exponent of the economic benefits of nineteenth-century colonial trade.

Torrens was aimed at the upper end of the market. Her passenger accommodation was first and second class passengers only. Apart from the crew, she carried "a surgeon, a stewardess and a good cow". Another luxury that passenger would have appreciated was an ice house.

Elder registered Torrens in London. Her official number was 73595 and her code letters were WTJL.

== Early voyages ==
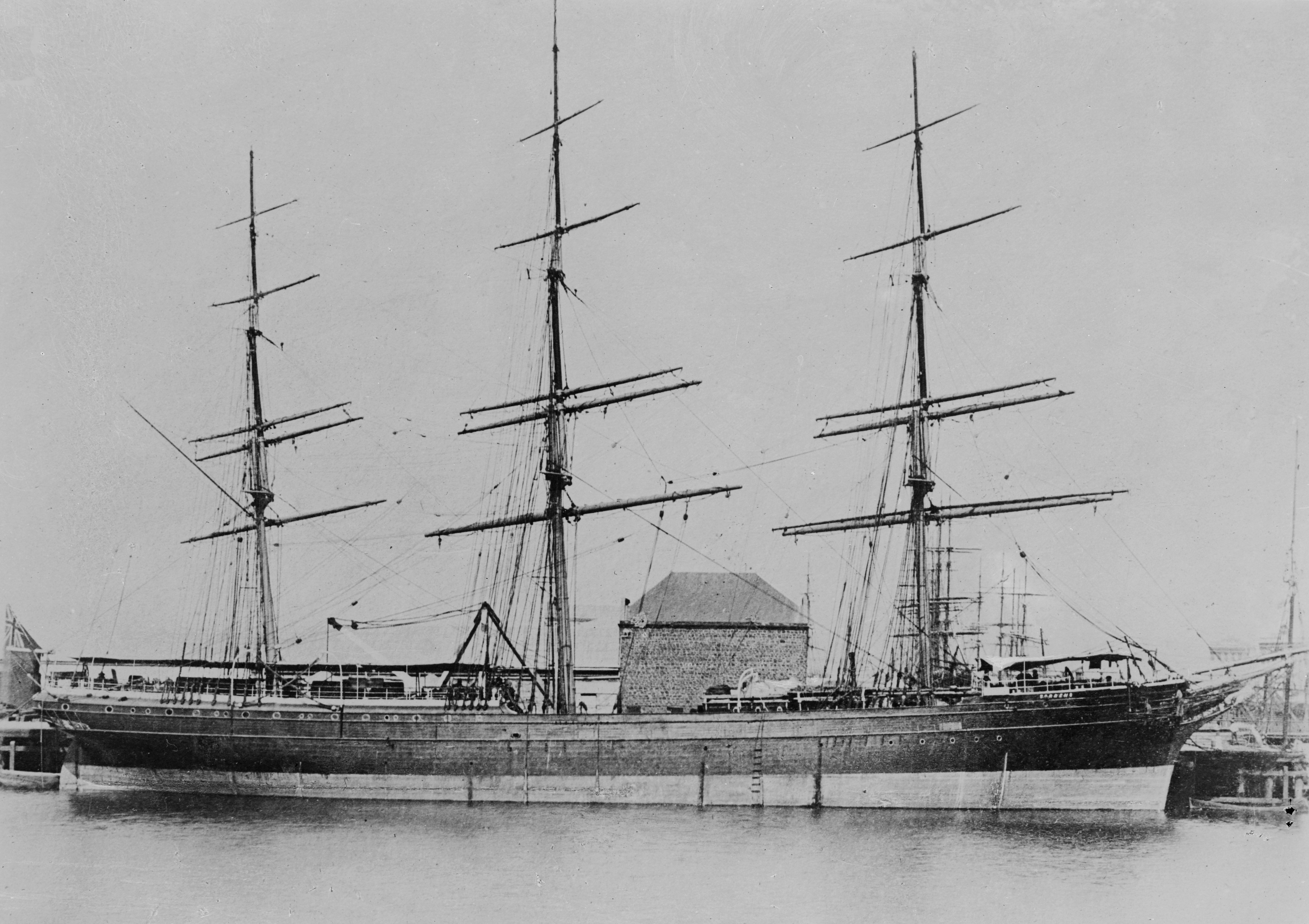
Torrens seen from starboard

Torrens was managed by Elder, Smith & Co. and captained by Angel who, as Commodore of Elder's fleet, flew a version of its house flag with a red crescent and two stars on a white field rather than white on red. Angel had previously commanded Glen Osmond and Collingrove on the same route for Elders. His time with Torrens was remarkably happy: fifteen voyages to Adelaide without serious incident. Her fastest time from Plymouth to Port Adelaide was 65 days and the slowest 85, with an average of 74. That was far quicker than any other ship of the period.

Torrens' outward journey to Adelaide was via the Cape of Good Hope. Angel customarily entered Port Adelaide via the Backstairs Passage rather than Investigator Strait. On her return voyage she called at Cape Town, Saint Helena and Ascension Island.

Torrens carried a number of notable passengers, including the Congregationalist minister Rev. C. W. Evan, first minister of Stow Memorial Church. He died aboard on 22 August 1876, just as she was nearing London. His wife had recently died, he was in poor health, and he was returning to England in the hopes of a recovery.

== Later years ==
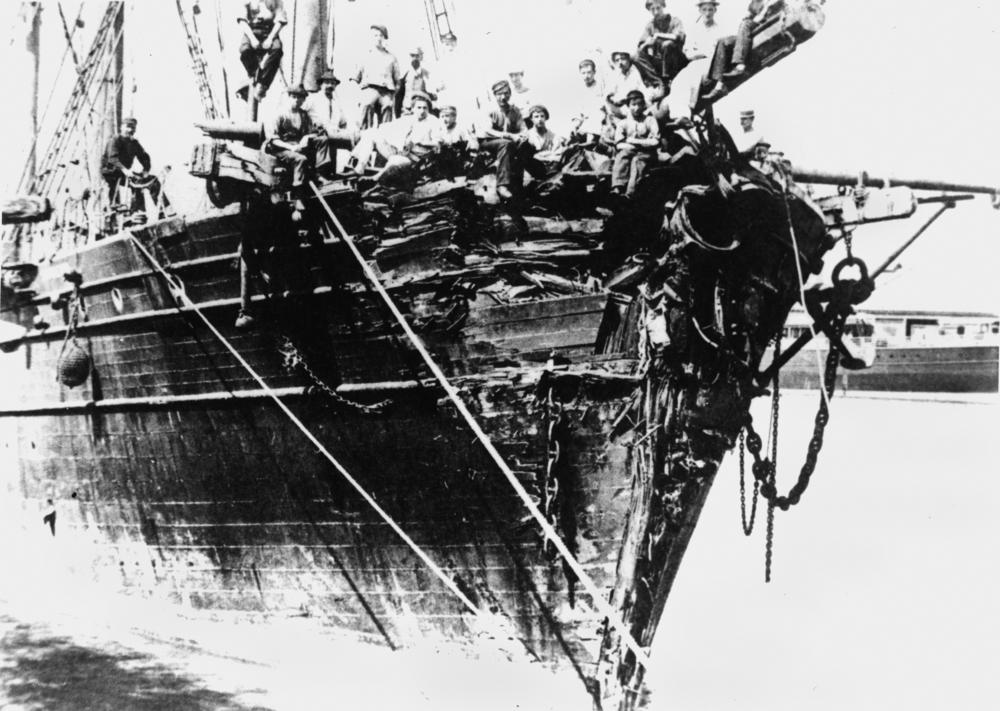
Torrens' bow in 1891, showing the damage from hitting an iceberg

In 1890, Captain Henry Robert Angel retired from active seafaring and handed her command to Captain WH Cope. From this moment, her fortune changed. In 1891 she lost her foremast and main topmast in 1891. While she was being refitted in Pernambuco, a fire broke out on board.

Angel's son, Captain Falkland Angel, took over her command over in 1896. On the evening of 11 January 1899 she struck an iceberg some 22 nautical miles (40 km) southwest of the Crozet Islands and limped into Adelaide dismasted, with her bow stoved in. Neither Cope nor Falkland Angel achieved shorter voyages than Angel's average of 74 days.

== Lost figurehead ==
When Torrens hit the iceberg and lost her foretopmast, jib-boom and bowsprit, she also lost her figurehead, modelled on Angel's daughter, Flores, and carved by Joseph Melvin. In 1973, two ANARE expeditioners discovered a headless figurehead of a woman at Sellick Bay, on the mid-west coast of Macquarie Island. There has been some speculation that this may be that of Torrens. Macquarie Island is a considerable distance from the site of the collision at the Crozets, but it is conceivable that the Antarctic Circumpolar Current could have carried it that distance, or that the figurehead even made two or more circumflotations of Antarctica.

== Literary connections ==
Joseph Conrad was Torrens' Chief Officer from November 1891 to June 1893 under Cope. It was on one of his two outward voyages to Australia that he showed one WH Jacques the draft manuscript of his first novel, Almayer's Folly. In March 1893, on the return Port Adelaide-to-Cape Town leg, Conrad struck up a friendship with Edward Lancelot Sanderson and the future Nobel literary laureate John Galsworthy. Galsworthy had sailed to Australia with the intention of meeting Robert Louis Stevenson, but by chance met Conrad instead.

Conrad wrote of the Torrens:

"A ship of brilliant qualities – the way the ship had of letting big seas slip under her did one's heart good to watch. It resembled so much an exhibition of intelligent grace and unerring skill that it could fascinate even the least seamanlike of our passengers."

Although it is generally accepted that Torrens was Conrad's last ship, he did spend a few weeks in 1893–1894 as second officer of Adowa.

== Italian ownership ==
In 1906 Italian owners bought Torrens for £1,500 and registered her in Genoa. She ran ashore, and her new owners sent her to be broken up. However, the shipbreakers were so taken with her aesthetic appearance that they refused to break her up, and repaired her instead. Soon she ran aground again. She was scrapped at Genoa in 1910.

== Captain Henry Robert Angel ==
After retiring from active sea life, Henry Robert Angel set up a smelting works in Stratford, London. He retired to South Devon and lived to be 93. He died in Las Palmas after injuring himself in a fall aboard the steamship Highland Piper, which was taking him to his favourite holiday spot. According to one story, the ship had struck heavy weather and he had refused to go below decks. His eldest son, Falkland Angel, was at his bedside before he died, probably of pneumonia.

Angel's brother, Richard Angel, was also a sea captain of some note, commanding Verulam and Beltana. Although clearly a strong captain and capable seaman, he was intemperate in habits, and was suspended for two years after he ran Beltana aground on Kangaroo Island in 1871, failed to report the damage, and falsified the log. He later found work as Chief Officer of Tongoy, whose captain was murdered at Semaphore.

== In art and commerce ==
- In 1957 Poczta Polska issued a postage stamp depicting Joseph Conrad and Torrens.
- A. Simpson and Company produced a brass fire-screen depicting Torrens under sail.
- The Art Gallery of Nova Scotia holds an oil painting On the Deck of the Ship Torrens by Jack L. Gray.
- Montague Dawson made a painting of Torrens at sea.
- A large scale model of Torrens is on display in the Sunderland Art Gallery and Museum, in the town where she was built.
- The Captain Cook Bicentennial "Sea Festival Dollar" issued by British Columbia in 1978 has a depiction of the Clipper Torrens on the reverse.
- The video game Alien: Isolation uses Torrens as the name of the spacecraft on which the story begins. This is in keeping with the custom of the naming of the Narcissus and Sulaco from the Alien films, themselves named after subjects of Conrad's life and works.

== Other references ==
- "Torrens" was a large house on the edge of Harbledown, Canterbury, Kent, built in the early 1920s, where Joseph Conrad's widow Jessie lived until her death. Sitting in grounds of just under 3 acres, its extensive gardens and orchard became overgrown sometime after 1955. The house became abandoned after 1991 and was finally demolished in 2004 and replaced by a modern development. the only part of the first house still standing is the annexe "Little Torrens" - now a detached house, built in the 1950s for the son and daughter-in-law of the main house occupants.

The original house was at one time a private school for both boarders and day boys until 1977. A second house was built to the same design in Rhodes Minnis, near Canterbury.

== Some other clippers on the England to South Australia run ==
- City of Adelaide
- Coonatto
- The Goolwa
- Hesperus
- The Murray
- Orient
- Rodney
- St Vincent
- South Australian
- Yatala
