= Baptist Union of Papua New Guinea =

- Classification: Evangelical Christianity
- Theology: Baptist
- Associations: Baptist World Alliance
- Headquarters: Mount Hagen, Papua New Guinea
- Origin: 1977
- Congregations: 500
- Members: 85,100
- Hospitals: 3
- Primary schools: 40
- Seminaries: 2
- Official website: bupng.org.pg

The Baptist Union of Papua New Guinea is a Baptist Christian denomination in Papua New Guinea. It is affiliated with the Baptist World Alliance. The headquarters is in Mount Hagen.

== History ==
The Baptist Union of Papua New Guinea has its origins in a mission of the Australian Baptist Ministries in 1850. It is officially founded in 1977. According to a census published by the association in 2025, it claimed 500 churches and 85,100 members.

== Schools ==
The convention has 40 primary schools gathered in the Baptist Education Agency.

It has 2 affiliated theological institutes.

== Health Services ==
The convention has 3 hospitals.
