= Thea Gaia =

Australian religious minister

thea Gaia
- Born: Dorothy Ivy Wacker
- Died: 15 May 2016; Canberra
- Known for: First female minister Congregational Church, Queensland. Midwife for Goddess Spirituality, Australia

Born Dorothy Ivy Wacker, thea Gaia (stylised as thea) was the first female ordained as a Minister of Religion within the Congregational Church of Australia in Queensland. She has been described as the 'midwife' of Goddess spirituality in Australia.

== Early life ==
Gaia was the eldest of four children born to Anne and George Wacker of Gatton, Queensland.

She finished high school in 1947 and studied primary teaching at Queensland Teacher's College.

== Career ==
Gaia worked at the School for the Deaf, Dutton Park, Brisbane between 1950 and 1952.

During this time she joined South Brisbane Congregational Church and became President of Queensland Congregational Youth Fellowship.

At age 22, she began a Bachelor of Arts and Bachelor of Divinity at University of Queensland in order to become a minister. She was ordained on 17 April 1959 at Broadway, Woolloongabba. She served terms at Belmont, Broadway and Chernside Congregational Churches.

In 1965–8, Gaia was the Director of Christian Education. At this same time (1966–7) she was also Acting Secretary of Queensland Congregational Union.

In 1970, she was called to Applecross Church in Perth. In Perth she continued her leadership as State President of the Congregational Union (1973), Vice President (1973–5) and then President Elect of the Congregational Union of Australia (1975–77). Gaia was also a member of the World Council of Churches in Nairobi in 1975 and President of Australian Church Women (1975–7).

At this time she was called to Pilgrim City Church, Adelaide. In Adelaide she served as chairperson for the Australian Consultation of Theologically Trained Women.

In 1982, she resigned her position in the church because she began "to seriously question the validity of religious systems in a person’s spiritual quest, with all their hierarchical structures, authority, tradition and patriarchal emphasis, and the general place of women in church and society." In the same year, she changed her name from Dorothy - meaning gift of god - to thea Rainbow to show her connection to the Goddess.

Gaia became increasing disillusioned with the church and in 1984 travelled to the USA and lived in California.On her return to Australia in the 1990s, she moved to Canberra where she worked as a tutor at the University of Canberra. In 1994, she changed her name again to thea Gaia.

In 2003, she was living in the Blue Mountains and was writing an autobiography.

== Writing ==
Gaia published in various women centred theology journals including Magdalene and Women-Church Journal. She also contributed the chapter Goddess/Witch/Womon in Practising the Witch's Craft: Real Magic Under a Southern Sky by Douglas Ezzy.

== Women's groups ==
Gaia was pivotal in the development of The Rainbow Circle - one of Australia's first feminist women's communities, Woman's Spirit Rising - a Canberra Goddess community, Gaia womanspace - a women's connective, Sisters of Gaia.

== Death ==
Gaia died on May 15, 2016, at 85 years of age.
