= Bangladesh Baptist Church Fellowship =

- Classification: Evangelical Christianity
- Theology: Baptist
- Associations: Asia Pacific Baptist Federation, Baptist World Alliance
- Headquarters: Dhaka, Bangladesh
- Origin: 1920
- Congregations: 541
- Members: 56,500
- Aid organization: Baptist Aid-BBCF

The Bangladesh Baptist Fellowship (BBF) is a Baptist Christian denomination in Bangladesh. It is affiliated with the Baptist World Alliance. The headquarters is in Dhaka.

== History ==
The Fellowship has its origins in a New Zealand mission in 1886. It was formed in 1920 as the East Bengal Baptist Union. According to a census published by the association in 2023, it claimed 541 churches and 56,500 members.

== Baptist Aid-BBCF ==
In 1994, it founded Baptist Aid-BBCF, a humanitarian organization.

== See also ==
- Asia Pacific Baptist Federation
- Baptist World Alliance
