= C. W. Evan =

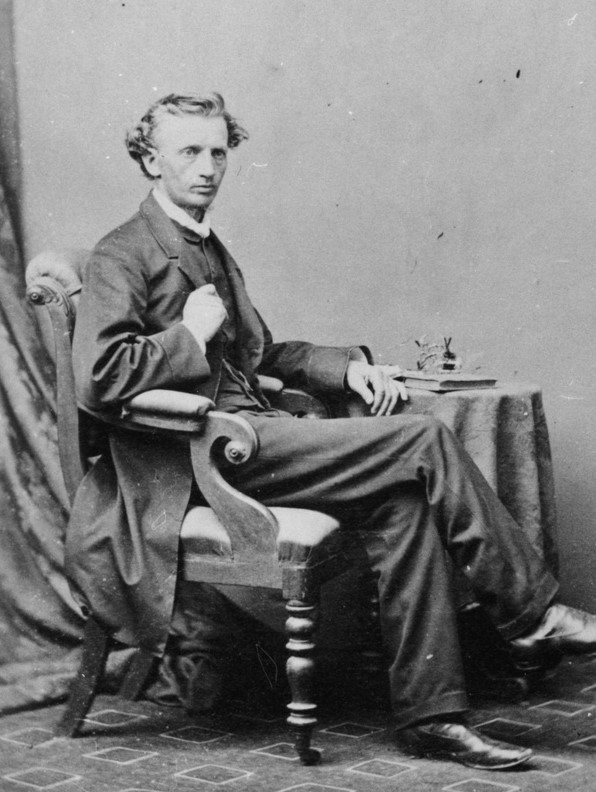

Cadwallader William Evan ( – 21 August 1876), generally referred to as Rev. C. W. Evan, was a Congregationalist minister in colonial South Australia, the first to serve at the Stow Memorial Church, Flinders Street, Adelaide.

== History ==
Evan was born in Wales educated at Airedale College, Yorkshire, and graduated B.A. from London University. In 1855 he was serving as pastor for the Independent Church at Saint Peter Port, Guernsey, when he was approached by the Revs. Thomas Binney and George Smith, who had been charged by the Congregational church of Freeman Street, Adelaide, with recruiting a young minister to act as coadjutor (assistant) to the aged and ailing Rev. T. Q. Stow. He arrived on the James Baines on 27 October 1855, and preached his first sermons at the Freeman Street chapel on 4 November 1855. In 1861, responding to his deteriorating health Charles Manthorpe was brought in as co-pastor.

Rev. Evan was involved in the planning and erection of the Stow Memorial Church as a replacement for the Freeman Street chapel, which began in mid-1863, and opened in April 1867. He was closely involved with the Adelaide Young Men's Association, a non-sectarian literary society.

Evan and his family lived at Hagen House, East Terrace, where on 2 January 1869 his wife Ellen (née Pearce) gave birth to a daughter, her eighth child, and died on 21 January 1869.

He suffered ill health and was forced to retire, being replaced by the Rev. C. B. Symes in March 1872. He returned to England, but died aboard the SS Torrens before disembarkation.

== Family ==
C. W. Evan and his wife Ellen had eight children, among them

- Mostyn Evan (22 September 1861 – 25 December 1924)
- Cadwallader Burton Evan ( – 16 July 1933) assisted his father
- Winifred Maude Evan, who married Arthur Webb Pettit on 28 July 1897.
