= Flinders Street Baptist Church =

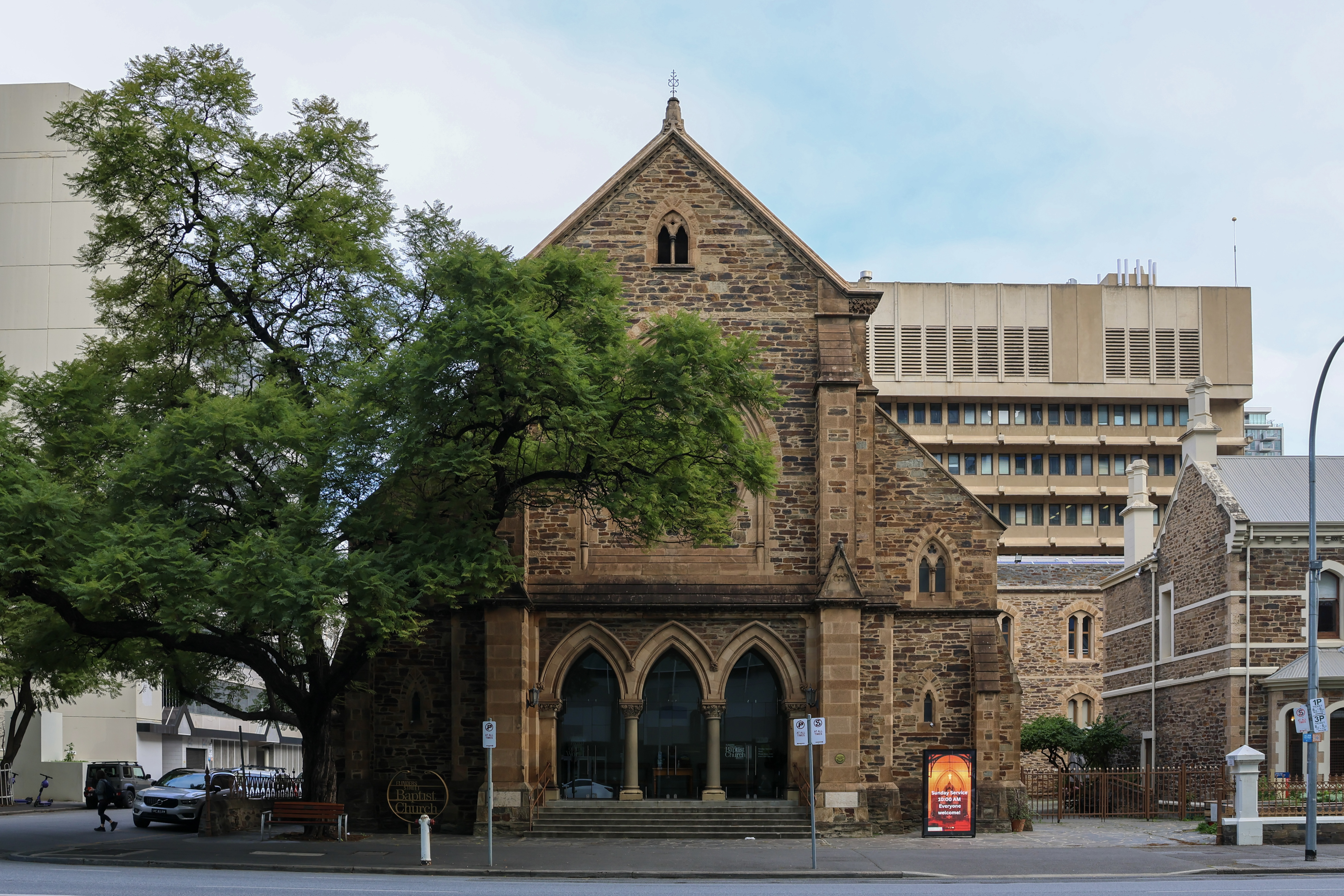
- Flinders Street Baptist Church, 2026
- Flinders Street Baptist Church
- 34°55′38″S 138°36′11″E
- Address: 71-75 Flinders Street, Adelaide, South Australia
- Country: Australia
- Denomination: Baptist
- Website: fsbc.asn.au

History
- Status: Church
- Dedicated: 19 May 1863

Architecture
- Architect: Robert G. Thomas
- Architectural type: Church
- Style: Gothic Revival
- Years built: 1861 – 1863
- Construction cost: A£7,000

Specifications
- Materials: Bluestone; sandstone

South Australian Heritage Register
- Official name: Flinders Street Baptist Church
- Type: State heritage
- Designated: 28 May 1981

Flinders Street Baptist Church is a heritage-listed Baptist church located at 71-75 Flinders Street, Adelaide, South Australia, Australia. The church is affiliated with the Australian Baptist Ministries.

== History ==
In response to a call by George Fife Angas for a Baptist minister to found a new congregation in Adelaide, Rev. Silas Mead emigrated aboard Parisian, arriving in July 1861. He began taking regular services at White's Rooms and soon his enthusiastic congregation decided to build a large church on Acre 273 in Flinders Street on the west corner of Divett Place.

Robert G. Thomas, the architect who would later be responsible for the Stow Memorial Church (now Pilgrim Uniting Church), was selected to design the building, which is of Gothic revival style in bluestone and sandstone with elaborate capitals on the columns, a rose window and front entrance with three arches supported by pillars.

The building, which cost A£7,000 and took English & Brown two years to build, was opened on 19 May 1863. The debt was cleared the following year, Mead Hall was erected in 1867–1870, and the manse was built in 1877.

The Australian Baptist Missionary Society was formed at the church under Rev Silas Mead in 1864, and the first missionary, Ellen Arnold, sent from there in 1882.

== Pastors ==
- 1863–1895 Silas Mead
- 1895–1905 John Garrard Raws
- 1905–1908 James Mursell
- 1908–1921 Peter Fleming
- 1921–1926 Frederick Benskin
- 1927–1933 Donovan Mitchell
- 1934–1943 J. Arthur Lewis
- 1944–1953 Samuel Millar
- 1954–1967 Leslie Gomm
- 1968–1977 Neil Adcock
- 1978–1979 John Hughes

== Heritage listing ==
On 28 May 1981, the church was listed on the South Australian Heritage Register.

The manse, in which Mead dwelt and his successors dwelt for many years, is now known as the Baptist Church Office, also known as Flinders House. Both the manse and Mead Hall were listed on 11 December 1997.
