= Charles Manthorpe =

English Congregationalist minister

Rev. Charles Manthorpe (31 March 1836 – 6 December 1898) was a Congregationalist minister remembered for his 36-year pastorate in Glenelg, South Australia.

== History ==
Manthorpe was born and grew up in Norwich, East Anglia, and began his working life as a teacher in nearby Peafield, and was engaged as a lay preacher in nearby villages. Encouraged and guided by his pastor, Rev Mr. Alexander, he studied for the Christian ministry and after a few years was appointed to the Congregational Church at Long Stretton, then in 1856 was called to Newport, Essex, where he was ordained and succeeded the old Rev. Mr. Hopkins.

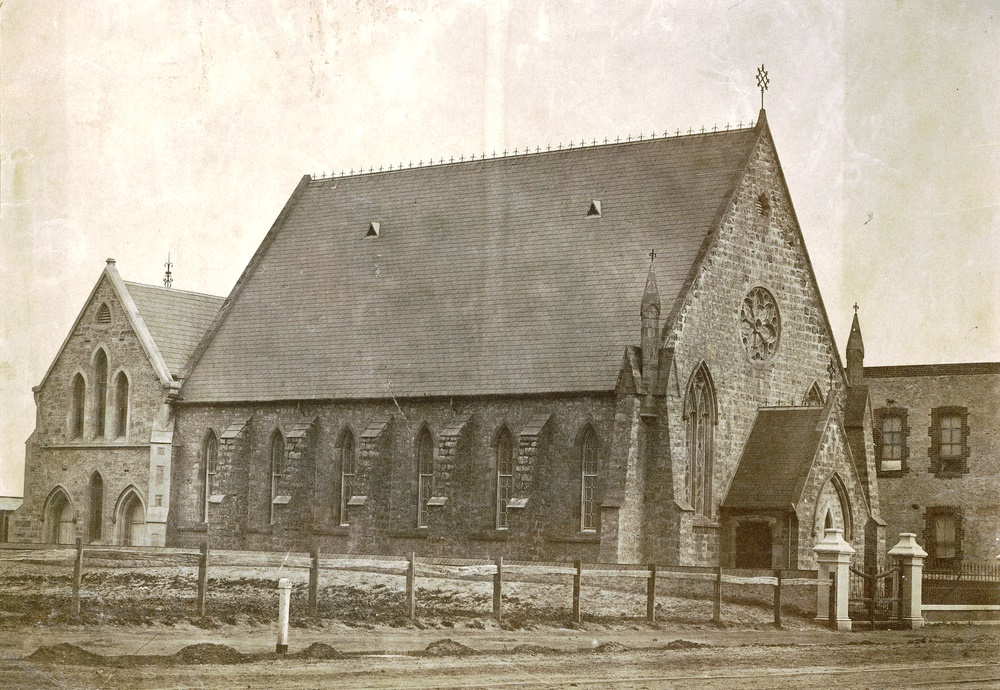
Glenelg Congregational church c. 1870

This was at a time when missionaries were competing to develop churches in the farthest reaches of the British Empire, and at Rev. J. L. Poore's urging, Manthorpe accepted a call to South Australia in 1858. On arrival he was posted to the churches of Happy Valley and Morphett Vale, whose incumbent, the Rev. A. R. Philps had been transferred to Truro. In 1861 he was appointed co-pastor of the old Freeman Street (now Gawler Place, Adelaide) church, whose pastor C. W. Evan was in poor health. In May 1862 he was called to take over the Glenelg church, which was in serious trouble: the popular and enthusiastic Rev. Charles Edwin Palmer, who had on the basis of a swelling congregation taken out a large loan to replace the 1848 church, built by H. J. Moseley, then abruptly resigned to become ordained in the Church of England. By April 1861 the Sunday School was disbanded and the congregation shrunk to a dozen shouldering a debt of £1,300.

Manthorpe commenced at Glenelg in May 1862, and immediately had the church interior finished and made more attractive. Under his pastorate the congregation returned and the Sunday School re-established and within a year the debt had been reduced by £500. He had a new manse built at a cost of £1,050. By 1877 the building was clearly inadequate to the purpose and plans were made for a replacement on the adjoining block at a total cost of £6,900. In September 1879 the new building measuring 80 by 50 feet (24 m × 15 m) with seating for 700, now St Andrews Uniting Church, was opened at 92 Jetty Road, Glenelg.

During his 36-year pastorate Manthorpe returned to England twice; on the first, undertaken in 1875 with his son Charles Edward, the ship's cargo of wool caught fire and the Aurora, on her maiden voyage, had to be abandoned off the Azores and the journey completed on another vessel. His second was undertaken in 1891 as a delegate to the International Council of Congregational Churches in London. Shortly after his return he resigned, leaving in 1892, though he remained the titular pastor until April 1898.

For several years he was without a charge, preaching at special services and acting as temporary replacement as opportunity arose, notably the tiny New Parkside Congregational Church which had hitherto relied on lay preachers. Gradually attendance increased, and again the necessity for a larger building became evident. The foundation stone for the new building was laid by Mrs. S. J. Way. At its first service on 27 November 1898 Manthorpe was due to read the first lesson, but he was so frail, his eyesight so poor, and his voice so weak that his friend F. W. Cox was obliged to take over the duty. Manthorpe attended several services in the new building before his death.

== Recognition ==
- He was appointed Chairman of the Congregational Union in 1863 and in 1871
- The Manthorpe Memorial Church on Unley Road, Unley was named for him. A picture may be viewed here.
- A memorial plaque and window dedicated to his memory were installed in the Glenelg church in 1900, unveiled by his friend F. W. Cox. The ornate memorial may be viewed here.

== Family ==
Charles Manthorpe (31 March 1836 – 6 December 1898) married Harriet Whitridge Baker ( –1920) on 20 October 1859. Harriet was the eldest daughter of Rev. E Baker, of Morphett Vale. Their large family included:

- Charles Edward Manthorpe (1860– 1922) married Edith Margaret Preston (1862–1940) on 20 April 1886.
- Emma Sarah Manthorpe (1863–1944) married Tullie Comthwaite Wollaston in 1886
- Ruth Agnes Manthorpe (1865–1901) married Ralph James Beckwith in 1888
- Florence Manthorpe (1868– 1939)
- Elinor Manthorpe (1869– 1884)
- Marion Manthorpe (1872–1897) married Sidney Herbert Hambridge in 1896
- Percy Wayte Manthorpe (1876– 1923)
- Eva Alice Manthorpe (1879–1972) married George Percival Howie in 1910
