= Flinders Street, Adelaide =

Street in Adelaide, South Australia

Flinders Street South Australia
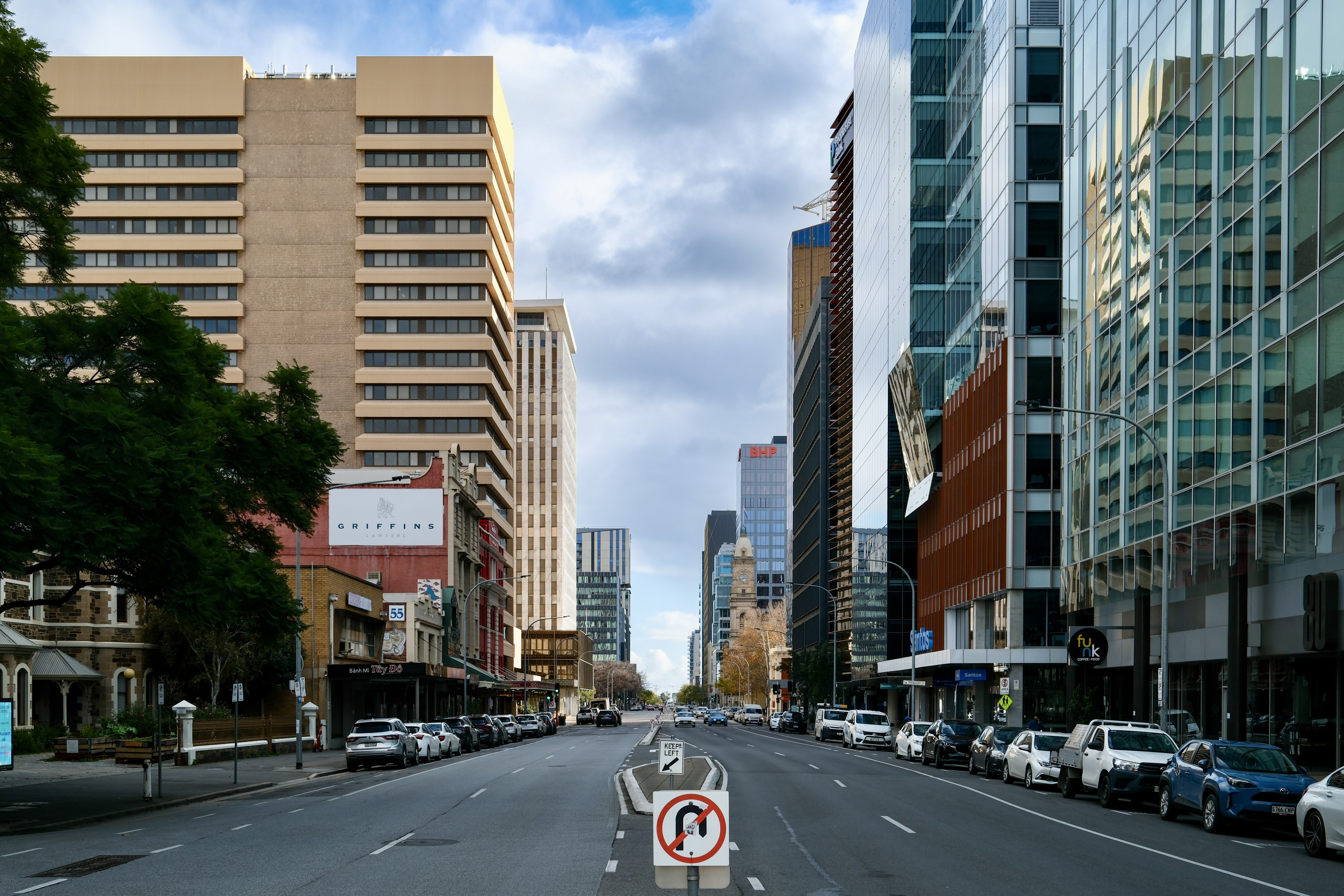
- Flinders Street, looking west
- Coordinates: 34.927151°S 138.599847°E (West end); 34.926495°S 138.612963°E (East end)

General information
- Type: Street
- Location: Adelaide city centre
- Length: 1.2 km (0.7 mi)
- Opened: 1837

Major junctions
- West end: King William Street; Adelaide
- Victoria Square; Pulteney Street; Frome Street; Hutt Street
- East end: East Terrace; Adelaide

Location(s)
- LGA(s): City of Adelaide

Flinders Street is a main street in the city centre of Adelaide, South Australia. It runs from the northern end of Victoria Square to East Terrace. It is one of the intermediate-width streets of the Adelaide grid, at 1 1/2 chains (99 ft; 30 m) wide.

== History ==
The street is named after the navigator and cartographer Captain Matthew Flinders.

On 22 November 1878 the East Adelaide Model School, later Flinders Street Public School or Flinders Street Model School, was opened in large bluestone buildings designed by E. J. Woods. A primary school occupied the premises until 1969, when the Flinders Street Adult Education Centre was established there. In 1978 it became the Flinders St School of Music, a campus of TAFE.

Many churches were built on Flinders Street in the 1860s and 1870s, and several survive today.

In August 2022, the City of Adelaide renamed a laneway off Flinders Street, behind Adelaide Town Hall, Paul Kelly Lane. Previously named Pilgrim Lane after the adjacent church, the lane is now called Paul Kelly Lane. It is the fourth such renaming after musicians associated with the city, the others being Sia Furler, No Fixed Address, and Cold Chisel.

== Historic buildings ==
=== Churches ===
As of 2022 churches on Flinders Street include:

- Bethlehem Lutheran Church, (Note: The Hermannsburg Choir sang at this church on their 1967 tour.) at no. 170, on the corner of Sudholz Place (Note: Named after co-founder of the church, Johann Sudholz.)
- Flinders Street Baptist Church, at no. 65; includes manse, now Baptist Church Offices, and Mead Hall; all heritage-listed.
- Pilgrim Uniting Church, at no. 12

=== Other historic buildings ===
- Flinders Hall, originally built as school accommodation for St Paul's Church of England, sold to Hamilton Laboratories in the 1950s
- Observatory House, at no. 84–86, originally built for a scientific instrument-making business run by Otto Boettger, who emigrated to South Australia from Germany in 1877
- Office of Multi-Cultural Affairs, originally the manse of the Stow Memorial Church (now Pilgrim), used as a sanitarium 1901–1911. before being sold to the state government
- St Paul's Church, built 1972, known as a High Anglican church, whose congregation included many prominent families; converted into a nightclub during the 1980s; now St Paul's Creative Centre, accommodating people working in the arts and creative industries

== The Jade ==
The Jade is a well-known music venue, located at 142-160 Flinders Street, in the heritage-listed St Paul's Rectory. Operating from 2002 as the Jade Monkey, it lost its home at 29 Twin Street in September 2012 after their lease was terminated, and after a public campaign, Pozible crowdfunding, and some help from Adelaide City Council and the state government, the owners, Naomi and Zac Coligan, reopened the new venue as The Jade in the rectory of St Paul's. The owners collaborate on musical projects with their neighbours in St Paul's Creative Space, and the venue has a large garden where there is a cafe. In 2018 they contracted a food truck, Phat Buddha Rolls, to provide food for patrons.

== Junction list ==
Location	km	mi	Destinations	Notes
Adelaide city centre	0	0.0	Victoria Square, King William Street	Continues as Franklin Street
Adelaide city centre	0.2	0.12	Gawler Place	
Adelaide city centre	0.55	0.34	Pulteney Street	
Adelaide city centre	0.75	0.47	Frome Street	
Adelaide city centre	1.1	0.68	Hutt Street	Eastern side of the intersection is permanently closed to traffic
Adelaide city centre	1.2	0.75	East Terrace	
1.000 mi = 1.609 km; 1.000 km = 0.621 mi
