= Silas Mead =

Australian Baptist minister

- Born: 16 August 1834
- Died: 13 September 1909

Silas Mead (16 August 1834 – 13 September 1909) was an English Baptist minister who founded the Flinders Street Baptist Church and South Australian Baptist Association in Adelaide, South Australia, and is remembered for the missionary work in India which he inspired.

== Early life and education ==
Mead was born on 16 August 1834 in Curry Mallet, Somerset, England, the youngest son of farmers Thomas and Honor Mead, née Uttermare. He was baptised at age 15 and helped local Baptists build a chapel, where he conducted services as a lay preacher. He attended night school at nearby Taunton, then entered Stepney College, which became Regent's Park College in 1856. Mead completed an MA there in "Mental Philosophy" in 1859 and an LLB in 1860. He took further studies at the University of London aiming for a doctorate of divinity, but was frustrated by their inability to grant such a degree.

== Career ==
Mead applied for a position with the Baptist Missionary Society but was rejected. Meanwhile George Fife Angas wrote to Regent's Park College seeking candidates for a Baptist ministry in Adelaide. Principal Joseph Angus recommended Mead, who accepted. In preparation for his arrival, Angas and the Baptist congregation each pledged £500 towards a building, as well as a stipend of £250 per year. They negotiated purchase of a block of land on Flinders Street and asked architect Robert Thomas, son of the newspaper proprietor to prepare plans.

=== South Australia ===
Mead arrived in South Australia aboard Parisian on 13 July 1861. On his first Sunday in Adelaide, he preached at the Ebenezer Independent Chapel in Rundle Street and soon began taking regular services at White's Rooms. On 5 August, twenty six members formed a new church congregation and on 18 December the foundation stone at Flinders Street Baptist Church was laid. The building cost £7000, was opened on 19 May 1863, and the debt was cleared the following year. The church established a mission in Faridpur, India, and encouraged Baptist churches in the other Australian colonies to establish similar missions. From 1862–1871, members of the church were "dismissed" by Mead to form new congregations in locations including Queenstown, Moonta, Gawler, Norwood, Hilton, and Georgetown. Mead advocated for the appointment of women as deaconesses and as South Australia debated women's suffrage, he signed the South Australian Women's Suffrage Petition and the church gave opportunity for women to speak in meetings. By 1874, Mead had 874 members at the church.

Mead was instrumental in the founding of the South Australian Baptist Association in October 1863. An Association library was established at Flinders Street Baptist in 1868, consisting largely of donations from Mead's own collection, and he was the inaugural editor of the denominational periodical, Truth and Progress the same year. He was a Board member and lecturer in Greek and Hebrew at the Adelaide Baptist Theological College, which was established in 1869. Mead's strong advocacy for believer's baptism by immersion and open membership, his emphasis on freedom and individual responsibility, and his disdain for creedal statements were influential on the Association, of which he was appointed President in 1867, 1872 and 1879, and then General Secretary for eight years. He was sometimes called the "Baptist Bishop".

In the wider community, Mead was an advocate on social issues including gambling, alcoholism, care for the needy, and funding for the "spiritual and social improvement of the Aborigines." He served as Vice President and President of the South Australian YMCA and helped drafted its constitution in 1878.

In 1867, Mead published a book titled Scripture Immersion, making a biblical case for believers baptism by immersion in response to a paper by English Methodist and advocate for infant baptism, John Hannah. He helped found Union College (later Parkin College) in 1872 for training ministers of three denominations: Baptist, Congregational and Presbyterian.

After his wife's death from typhoid in June 1874, Mead sought treatment overseas and spent fifteen months on leave while his sister in law looked after his five children in Adelaide. During his travels, Mead visited the mission work in Faridpur, spoke at the Baptist Union Assembly in Newcastle, visited the Holy Land and Europe, and met with leaders of the new holiness movement in England.

Mead arrived back in Adelaide on 19 November 1875. He moved with his children into the church's newly finished manse in 1877 and the following year married widow Mary Leighton.

The South Australian Baptist Missionary Society (later the Australian Baptist Missionary Society). was formed in November 1864, with Mead among the key drivers, and in 1882 he commissioned the first two missionaries, Ellen Arnold and Marie Gilbert. Mead made four visits to India and his son Cecil was the first man sent to the mission work in Bengal in 1892.

Mead founded the South Australian chapter of Christian Endeavour in 1888, serving as its President, then as first President of CE Australia in 1891, and in 1897 as President of the Australasian Christian Endeavour Union. He met with Hudson Taylor and William Booth on their visits to Adelaide in 1890 and 1891 respectively.

In 1891, Flinders Street Church appointed a new minister to serve under Mead, and then in August 1896 Mead resigned, with the church granting him the title of honorary pastor and a £100 annuity for life and requested the SA Baptist Association grant him life membership.

=== Later career ===
Mead returned to England in 1897 and on 1 October took up a position as principal of Henry Grattan Guinness's Harley College, London. He encouraged many students to consider missionary work, but his declining health led to his resignation in 1900. Students petitioned for him to remain as a tutor for another year.

Mead and his daughter, physician Gertrude, returned to Australia in 1901, settling in Perth where he joined his son-in-law, Alfred Wilson as co-pastor of the Baptist Church in Museum Street. When Wilson moved to New Zealand in 1907, Mead continued as 'honorary pastor'. He became a member of the Baptist Union of Western Australia Council, serving as President in 1902, and again became active in Christian Endeavour and Bible teaching, as well as advocacy on social issues. In 1902, he chaired the Interstate Baptist Federal Conference in Adelaide as the state associations debated forming a federal union. He chaired the WA Baptist Foreign Mission Committee and was a delegate to the Baptist World Congress in London in 1905.

== Death and legacy ==
Mead died from heart failure on 13 September 1909 in Gertrude's home in Perth and was buried at the Baptist cemetery in Karrakatta. He was remembered as the "Father of Baptist Missions in Australasia" in the Adelaide Advertiser and the "Father of the Australian Christian Endeavour Society" in The West Australian.

== Family ==
Mead met Anne "Annie" Staple (1839– 15 June 1874) in Somerset and she later travelled to Adelaide to marry him at Gumeracha on 25 May 1864; she died of typhoid fever aged 35. They had five children:

- Lilian Staple Mead (30 June 1865 – 27 November 1936) married Crosbie Brown on 16 August 1900. She assisted her father in promoting Christian Endeavour.
- Cecil Silas Mead (18 October 1866 – June 1940) graduated B.A., 1887; M.B., B.S., 1891 at the University of Adelaide, served as a medical missionary in eastern Bengal for twenty-nine years, returned to Adelaide to teach anatomy in 1923–1939.
- Gertrude Ella Mead (31 December 1867 – 6 November 1919), graduated MBBS in 1897, one of Australia's first female doctors and an advocate for child protection and aged care
- Annie Blanche Mead (8 January 1870 – 9 June 1961) married Rev. Alfred Samuel Wilson in 1896.
- Flora Beatrice Mead (20 January 1873 – 9 September 1886) died of typhoid fever.

He married again, to the widow Mary Leighton (c. 1835 – 21 March 1886) at Flinders Street on 22 October 1878. He had no further children.

== Sources ==
- A. C. Hill (1974). "Mead, Silas (1834–1909)". Australian Dictionary of Biography: Mead, Silas (1834–1909). National Centre of Biography, Australian National University.
- John Walker (2004). Australian Dictionary of Evangelical Biography: MEAD, Silas (1834-1909). Evangelical History Association of Australia.
- Rosalind M Gooden; Ken R Manley; Stefanie C Pearce, eds. (2023). Silas Mead (1834–1909) and his Baptist family. Sydney: Morling Press. ISBN 978-0-6454927-2-9.
