= Patrick Gay =

Australian cabinetmaker

Patrick Gay was a cabinetmaker and businessmen of Adelaide, South Australia, for whom Gay's Arcade was named.

== History ==
Patrick Gay, sen. (c. 1815 – 7 October 1866), his wife Agnes Waddell Gay (c. 1816 – 16 November 1903) and their small family left Fifeshire, Scotland, and emigrated to South Australia aboard James Fernie in 1854. In 1864 he established a cabinetmaking and undertaking business P. Gay & Son at 107 Rundle Street, on the Twin Street corner adjacent George Debney's furniture warehouse and in premises rented from Debney.

Patrick Gay (c. 1841 – 30 October 1911), who had been working for Debney, took over the business in 1867. Around 1875 he took over Debney's premises on a 28-year lease.

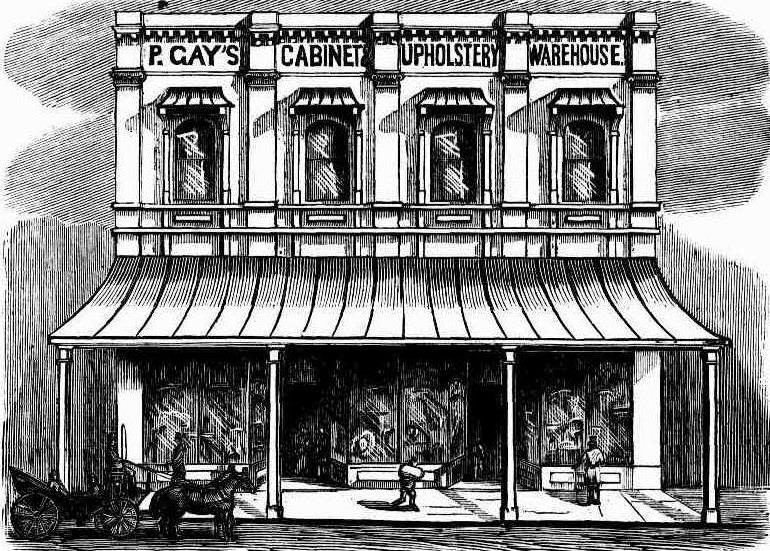
Gay's Warehouse 1880

In 1880 the warehouse had a 52-foot frontage to Rundle Street and 212-foot depth, 100-ft depth on Twin Street; the remaining portion at the corner of Twin and Rundle streets being occupied from 1773 by James Calder's City Steam Biscuit Factory.

=== The fire ===
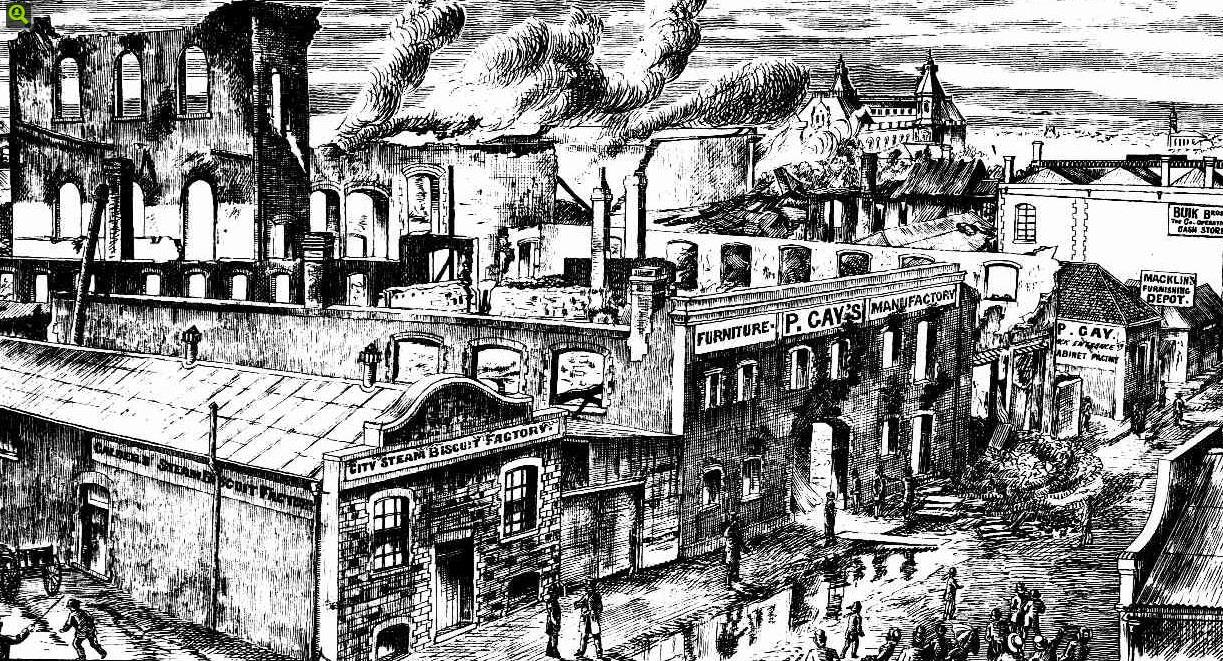
Gay's Warehouse after the fire 1884

The premises were completely destroyed by fire on Saturday 15 November 1884. The shop had been closed around 2:30 pm, and first signs of smoke noticed around 9 pm, and a fire hose deployed around 10. Without any evidence, the newspapers assumed arson ("incendiarists"), perhaps thinking of a disgruntled ex-employee, as Gay had sacked some of his work-force in response to the economic downturn of a year before, and those remaining were on short hours. At the inquest it transpired that there was a hole, accessible from the Sturt Stables, in the wall of the flockroom, adjacent to Gay's engine (gas driven) room. Flock and kapok, natural fibres used for stuffing mattresses and upholstery, are both somewhat flammable, and could conceivably be ignited by someone of malicious intent. All witnesses insisted Gay maintained good relations with all employees, past and present, and there was no enmity between his English and German workmen, who were on equal pay rates.

The inquest failed to decide on a probable cause, and Gay was able to claim from the insurance companies.

=== The arcades ===
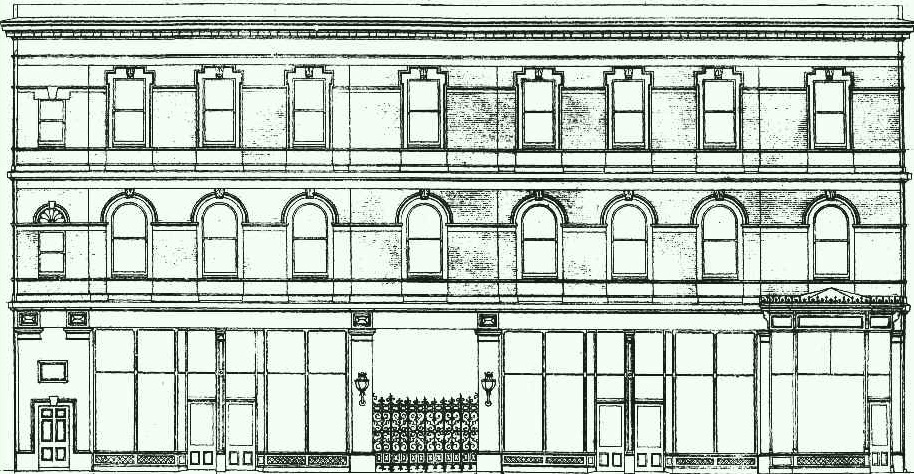
Gay's Arcade frontage Twin Street, Adelaide

The design for Adelaide Arcade had been completed and work commenced on its construction when a separate design by a different architect, James Cumming (c. 1825–1901), was commissioned for a three-storey building on Twin Street and an arcade to join Adelaide Arcade at right angles near the middle. The contract for building Gay's Arcade, as it would be named, was let to Nicholas Wallis Trudgen (c. 1829–1892), who was likewise not involved in the Adelaide Arcade project.

The syndicate of investors in the Adelaide Arcade consisted of Emanuel Cohen, J. M. Wendt, Patrick Gay, Saul Solomon, and L. H. Berens. It is not known whether the same or another group or even Gay himself financed Gay's Arcade.

Both arcades were completed by the beginning of December 1885; Gay's workshops, and warehouses occupied the upper two floors of the block building and one side of Gay's Arcade was devoted to his showrooms.

For more details see main article.

== Family of Patrick Gay ==
Patrick Gay, sen., (c. 1815 – 7 October 1866), his wife Agnes Waddell Gay (c. 1816 – 16 November 1903) of Fifeshire, Scotland, emigrated to South Australia in 1854. Their children included:

- Patrick Gay (c. 1841 – 30 October 1911) married Susannah Cooke (d. 12 April 1898) in 1878. He retired in 1902, was one of first members of the Caledonian Society and prominent member of the Adelaide Bowling Club; died at Glenelg.

she was mother of Edith, Courtenay, George, Harry, and Hayward Cooke.

- Archibald Gay ( – 4 September 1887) married Anne Mortimer (c. 1843 – 8 August 1869) on 25 December 1867. He married again, to Mary Watts Colbey (c. 1842 – 15 July 1906) in 1870. Archibald had an undertaking business at 119 Hindley Street, died at Little Bay (infectious diseases) Hospital in Sydney.
- Agnes Waddell Gay (c. 1854 – 19 March 1913) married John Thomas Fitch (1851 – 19 June 1924), son of John Thomas Fitch
- Isabella Gay (c. 1856 – 14 April 1881) married John Giles in 1880. Giles, a son of Charles Giles nurseryman of Magill, had his own Exotic Nursery at Kent Town, later the site of the Rosella Jam Factory. He married again in 1883, to Frances Root; moved to Kapunda; their son Edward Ainsworth Giles (16 July 1886 – 1954) was a noted bowling green keeper.
- Margaret Lundy Gay (d. 1909) married James Windmill Porter (c. 1850 – 1918) in 1875. Porter pioneered top dressing with superphosphates. A grandson, Sir Robert Evelyn Porter was a Lord Mayor of Adelaide.

William Waddell (died 1892), an uncle, was employed by Gay. His son, William James Waddell (1867–1935) worked for G. & W. Murray. His second son, George Waddell (died 1942), was employed by Gay as a cabinetmaker.
