= Emanuel Cohen (businessman) =

Australian businessman (1835–1895)

Emanuel Cohen (c. 1835 – 17 November 1895) was businessman in South Australia, and was responsible for the erection of several of Adelaide's premier buildings.

== History ==
Cohen was born in London and emigrated to Australia, arriving in Melbourne aboard Coromandel in August 1852, and made his way to Adelaide in the same month. It was the time of the Victorian gold rush, and he joined the exodus to the diggings. He had no luck as a prospector, and worked and joined with a company supplying requisites to the diggers at Forest Creek, Barkers Creek, Loddon, Bendigo, Maryborough, Avoca and Tarrengower. At Bendigo (then named Sandhurst) he renewed acquaintance with author B. L. Farjeon who founded a newspaper there. In 1856 he returned to Adelaide, where he began speculating as a property developer. Among his notable activities were:

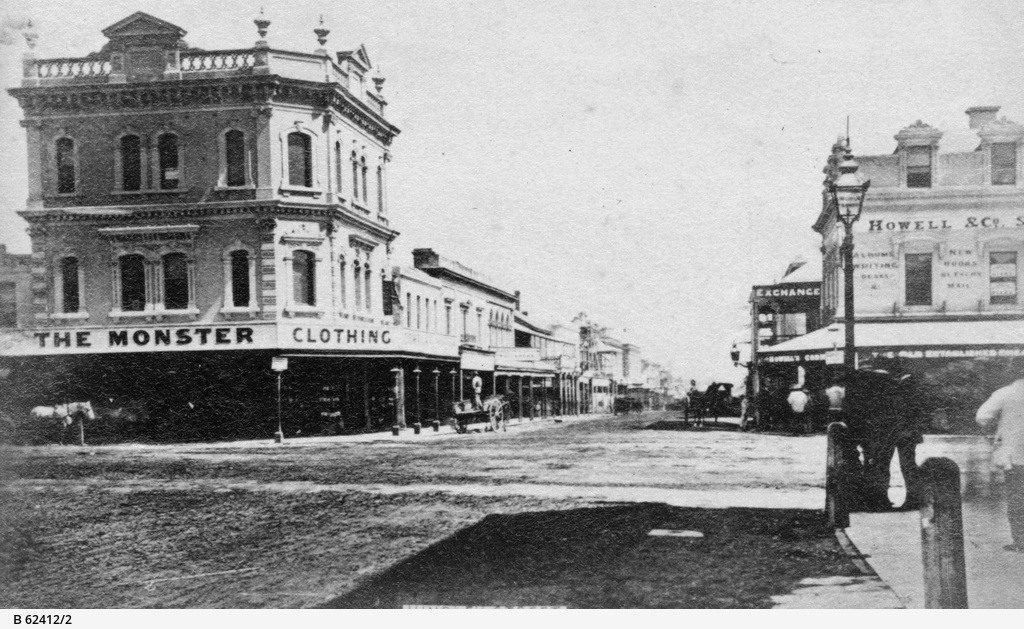
Monster Clothing Store at south corner King William and Hindley streets, c. 1882

- Around 1863 he pulled down three shops opposite the Globe Hotel in Rundle Street and rebuilt them.
- From 1865 he operated a general store in Goolwa, living on Admiral Terrace. His business was taken over in 1873 by Thomas Goode.
- He founded the Adelaide Central Auction Mart (also known as Adelaide Central Mart), opposite White's Rooms, King William Street, in 1876 selling the business to D. W. Melvin.
- In 1877 he built a three-storeyed building at "Muirhead's Corner" of King William and Hindley streets, for a time tenanted by the "Monster Clothing Palace". Cohen opened a restaurant, "Shades", in its large cellar.
- converted two shops into the International Hotel in Rundle Street
- built a warehouse for McLean Brothers & Rigg in Hindley Street.
- converted the old Commercial Bank (King William Street, opposite Bank of Adelaide) into the Comstock Chambers suite of offices
- converted R. H. Wigg & Co.'s premises in King William Street into two shops, one being Taylor's oyster saloon.
- built a 2-story family mansion at 68 Fullarton Road, Norwood, completed in 1883
- He was a member of the syndicate (with Wendt, Solomon and L. H. Behrens) that in 1885 built the Adelaide Arcade, and in London he personally selected the glass, the marble floor tiling, and the electric light fittings.

He died at his residence, Gover Street, North Adelaide.

== Family ==
Emanuel Cohen (1835 – 17 November 1895) married cousin Sarah Benjamin (23 January 1839 – 16 June 1920), on 11 December 1858. She died in Bondi. Their family included:

- Benjamin E. Cohen (14 September 1859 – ) married Matilda Victorsen ( – ) in 1876. He was manager of the jewellery department of P. Falk & Co.
- Anna Cohen (3 April 1861 – ) married Hindley Street draper Lewis Moss ( – ) in 1886; they lived at North Adelaide until 1892 or later.
- Moses Cohen (1863– ) employed in the Architect-in-Chief's office, Perth
- Samuel Elias Cohen (4 April 1866 – ) manager, jewellery department of Hoffnung & Co., Sydney.
- Philip Alfred "Paddy" Cohen (28 September 1867 – 22 March 1952) married widow Violet Annie "Nan" Wiggins (c. 1865 – 13 June 1941) on 12 July 1893
- Fredrick William Cohen (24 April 1871 – )
- Susan Frances Cohen (24 June 1872 – ) married Phillip Phillips ( – ), of Nelson, New Zealand, on 18 May 1862
- Rachel Cohen (17 June 1873 – )
- Daniel Tallerman Cohen (11 December 1874 – 1875)
- Julia Ethel Cohen (1880– )

Their home before 1866 was on Hindley Street, and "Lorne Villas", South Terrace from 1873.

His brother Samuel Cohen (c. 1822 – 11 June 1865) married Sarah's sister Fanny Benjamin (11 December 1822 – 24 March 1913) on 28 July 1852; they lived in Gawler; he died in New Zealand.
