= John Barker (businessman) =

John Barker (1847 – 21 May 1925) was a South Australian businessman and sportsman, noted for his long chairmanship of the South Australian Jockey Club.

== History ==
Alfred Barker (c. 1812 – 24 January 1880) and Priscilla Barker (1816 – 31 December 1900) née Chambers, a sister of James Chambers. Alfred arrived in South Australia as an officer on the brig Rapid in August 1836, his wife-to-be Priscilla aboard John Renwick in February 1837. They married in 1842. Alfred died at Baldina House, St. John's Wood, now part of Prospect, South Australia; Priscilla died at Henley Beach, South Australia

John Barker was born in Yankalilla, educated at John L. Young's Adelaide Educational Institution and was employed as a clerk with the Bank of Australasia. He married his cousin Catherine Chambers, daughter of James Chambers.

John and Catherine's brother Hugh Chambers (1848 – 20 December 1893) carried on business as Barker & Chambers, stock agents and auctioneers from 1877, taking over "Sturt yards" and building the "Sturt Horse Bazaar" on the east side of the Sturt Hotel, Grenfell Street.

In 1885 F. J. Beck & Co. purchased Baker & Chambers' property, and the Rundle Street site of Patrick Gay's burnt-out furniture factory, to build the Adelaide Arcade, between Rundle and Grenfell street and Gay's Arcade between it and Twin Street. Baker & Chambers took over the John Bull Livery Stables, Currie Street, Hugh Chambers died in 1893, and Barker was joined by Frank Cornelius, the firm being then styled Barker & Cornelius. Cornelius died in 1896, and Barker was joined by his brother Alfred James "Joker" Barker, and the business was carried on under the name of Barker Brothers. Alfred Barker retired and John Barker remained the senior partner of the firm until his death.

He was a member of a consortium with brother W. Pitt Barker and brothers-in-law Donald Maclean and Hugh Chambers that purchased Queensland cattle properties Gunnadorah, Gunnadorah West, Koraggarak, Lake Colless, Yungerah, Wombadullah, Owthorpe No.1 in 1882; Godesberg, Annie Jo Jo, Bonn, Denman, Gap, Galvin, Phipps, Stop, Theirs, and Youngwoman in 1883; Winbin, Winbin North and Tabletop in 1882; Colac, Derremut, Geneva in 1883; and consolidated them as Comongin holding in 1888; In 1890, after the death of his wife from tuberculosis, Donald Maclean and his daughter Mary Stewart Maclean moved to Comongin to live. In 1914 Comongin Pty. Ltd. was formed to take over the property. John Barker and Agnes May Chambers (who had inherited her father's share) sold their interest to the new company for £88,360.

When cattle dealer Edward Meade Bagot (1822 – 27 July 1886) (founder of Bagot, Shakes and Lewis), disappeared in 1886, John Barker organised the search party.

== Other interests ==
He was a director of the Adelaide Steamship Company and the Executor, Trustee & Agency Company, and a member of the local board of advice of Dalgety & Company, Limited.

During The Great War and afterwards he was active with the Red Cross Society.

He was chairman of the finance committee of the South Australian Soldiers' Fund, whose chairman was A. A. Simpson, a board member of the South Australian Chamber of Manufactures, whose president was Wallace Bruce and secretary was H. E. Winterbottom, and an adherent of the Church of England and a member of St. Cuthbert's Church, Prospect, whose rector was the Rev. W. H. Johnson. These gentlemen all contributed to his obituary.

== Horseracing ==
As a young man he was an aficionado of coursing, then turned to horse racing. He was partner with James Hill, of Clare in several horses including The Greek, winner in 1909 of the South Australian Derby. Another of his horses, Gunadorah, out of Eudorus, won several good races in Victoria. He was elected to committee of the South Australian Jockey Club in 1894, and was appointed chairman in May 1909, succeeding Sir Richard Baker. He served in both capacities until July 1924, when he resigned from the board, and was made a life member of the club. Chairman W. B. Carr and S. J. Jacobs, a fellow committeeman, contributed to his obituary.

He acted as honorary judge at both S.A.J.C. and (rival) A.R.C. meetings, and his decisions were never questioned. The Chairman of the Adelaide Racing C1ub, James Hall, and Dr. A. F. Lynch, acting Chairman of the Port Adelaide Racing Club while Dr. A. V. Benson was away at the war, also paid tributes.

== Family ==
Barker married his cousin Catherine Chambers (1843–1904), daughter of James Chambers on 11 March 1872, after who the town of Katherine, Northern Territory was named.

They had three children:

- Eleanor Kate Barker (1875 – 2 August 1954) of Prospect
- Alfred Edward Barker ( – 25 June 1925), of Alpha road, Prospect
- Priscilla Mary Barker (1883 – 11 June 1918)

They had a residence "Wingfield", 22 Alpha Road Prospect.

Barker's siblings included W(illiam) Pitt Barker (1845 – 17 February 1914) who married Jane Young on 26 May 1875; Mary Barker ( – 1890) who married Donald Maclean on 21 June 1866; Priscilla Barker (1853– ) who married Hermann von Rieben in 1892; and Alfred James Barker (1858–1923) who married Elizabeth Jean Bowman in 1896.
