= F. J. Beck & Co. =

Charles Beck (c. 1813 – 1 July 1883) arrived in South Australia aboard Eden in June 1838. He started business in partnership with James Waddell of Leadenhall Street as the Adelaide representative of ship brokers, merchants and insurance and commission agents Waddell, Beck & Co. and Charles Beck & Co., with offices in Finsbury Square, which companies became bankrupt in 1843.

Ships for which he was agent prior to his bankruptcy include the brig David; The Duchess of Northumberland, ship of 550 tons; Morley, ship of 578 tons, Mary, barque of 270 tons; Challenger, a schooner of 79 tons; Waterwitch, a schooner of 99 tons; Hawk, schooner of 116 tons.

His brother Frederick John Beck (died 7 December 1855) had arrived in Adelaide by 1842. He and John Finlay Duff, acting as attorneys for Beck and Waddell, were accused of secreting their books and property from the assignees.

Charles and brother Frederick then founded F. J. Beck & Co., merchants, agents and financiers in South Australia, with a warehouse on Rundle Street, which was taken over by G. M. Waterhouse in 1846.

Frederick John Beck married Jane Edwards in England on 2 February 1847, returned to South Australia aboard Aboukir in September 1847.

The brothers were among the fortunate "Snobs", early investors in the South Australian Mining Association who made fabulous profits on their investments; Charles was elected a director and served as chairman in 1849. Charles sailed for London in 1850 and Frederick was elected director in his place. Charles, by now very wealthy, married Ellen Kingsman Sladen in England on 13 July 1852, and settled at Grove road, St. John's Wood. Ellen was a daughter of John Baker Sladen of Ripple Court, Kent, and sister of Charles Sladen. They never returned to Australia.

F. J. Beck, J. Hallett and Joseph Stilling (c. 1823–1863) were appointed Adelaide management of Adelaide Land and Gold Co., a French company, in July 1853, and in August the same year F. J. Beck, John Morphett and George Elder (1816–1897) founded South Australian Lloyds, on the principle of Lloyd's of London.

A third brother, John Beck (c. 1826 – 22 November 1903), arrived in Adelaide around the same time, perhaps the John Beck who arrived with his wife (no details known) aboard Brightman January 1850. In 1855 Frederick resigned as director of the S.A.M.A. board, and John took his place on the board. Frederick read a key address to the new Governor, and then disappeared from the limelight. He returned to Britain via Melbourne aboard the steamer Burra Burra, thence Oliver Lang and died in Handsworth, Staffordshire, on 7 December 1855. A later writer presumed he died in South Australia.

John Beck married Martha Campbell, née Levi, the widow of Charles James Fox Campbell (died 1859), on 7 August 1873. They left for England in 1882 and never returned. He was a director and largest shareholder of the Commercial Bank of South Australia when it collapsed in February 1886, so lost heavily. Martha died c. 1897.

F. J. Beck & Co. became involved in commercial real estate in the city. In 1885 they purchased Baker & Chambers' property, "Sturt Horse Bazaar" on Grenfell Street, and the Rundle Street site of Patrick Gay's burnt-out furniture factory. These properties became the Adelaide Arcade and Gay's Arcade In September 1885 F. J. Beck & Co. offered 50 year leases on two remnant Grenfell Street properties:90 by 90 feet (27 m × 27 m) adjoining Twin Street and 54 by 180 feet (16 m × 55 m) the other side of the Arcade.
