= Gaurav Tiwari =

Indian ghost hunter (1984–2016)

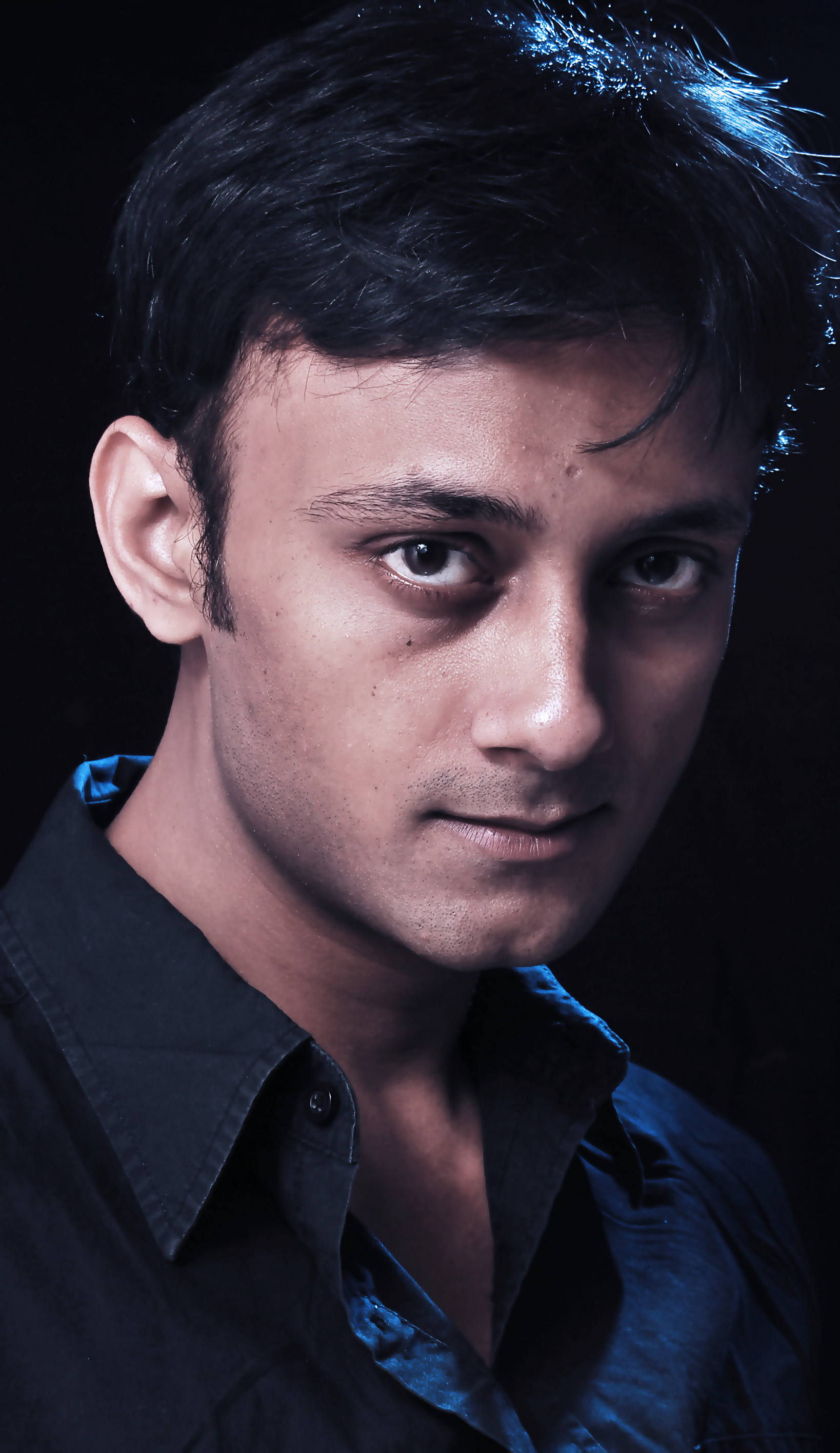
- Tiwari in 2002
- Born: 2 September 1984; Patna, Rajkot, India
- Died: 7 July 2016 (aged 31); Dwarka, Delhi, India
- Occupations: Paranormal investigator, Pilot, UFOlogist, Television presenter, Actor
- Organization: Indian Paranormal Society

Gaurav Tiwari (2 September 1984 – 7 July 2016) was an Indian paranormal investigator, UFO field investigator and ParaNexus representative in India who appeared on television shows such as MTV Girl's Night Out with Rannvijay Singh, Haunted Weekends with Sunny Leone, Aaj Tak, Live India, News 24, Star TV, Zee TV, Fear Files: Darr Ki Sacchi Tasvirein, Syfy's 'Haunting: Australia', and Sony TV's Bhoot Aaya. Tiwari was also a guest on paranormal radio shows and CEO and Founder of the Indian Paranormal Society.

== Early life ==
Tiwari was born on 2 September 1984, he was an ordained minister of Metaphysical Church of Humanistic Science. He made cameo appearances in the Hindi films 16 December and Tango Charlie. At the age of 21, he went to Florida to pursue his career in aviation, and later became interested in Paranormal investigation and Parapsychology.

== Career ==
Tiwari appeared on MTV Girls Night Out directed by Sajeed A. This show was India's first horror/paranormal reality show and it also won the Best Reality Show at the Asian Television Awards, Singapore, 2011. A similar show/repeat was Haunted weekends with Sunny Leone.

=== Bhoot Aaya investigation ===
Tiwari appeared as a paranormal expert and lead investigator in Bhoot Aaya describing the alleged paranormal activity.

=== Haunting: Australia ===
Tiwari appeared in the SyFy series Haunting: Australia along with fellow ghost hunters Robb Demarest, Ian Lawman, Ray Jordan, Rayleen Kable and Allen Tiller.

=== MTV He Ticket ===
Tiwari appeared as a mentor in one of the episodes of 'MTV He Ticket' where he guided the contestants at Bhangarh Fort.

== Death ==
Tiwari was found dead at his Dwarka home on July 7, 2016, prompting speculation in various media by fans and paranormal enthusiasts that his death was caused by vengeful spirits. However, following an autopsy, Delhi Police determined that Tiwari committed suicide by hanging himself inside his bathroom and that his death did not involve any foul play. According to Surender Kumar, DCP (South-West), "It is a clear case of suicide. He hanged himself in the bathroom using his wife's dupatta on Thursday night." Police investigating his death said that Tiwari "had no major projects lined up for the future" and what projects he had "brought in little money, but it was barely enough". This led to frequent disagreements with his family, and according to police, "his family, in fact, wanted him to take up a conventional job".

== In popular culture ==
- Bhay: The Gaurav Tiwari Mystery, a television series based on his life was released on 12 December 2025.
