= George Debney =

Australian politician

George Debney (1818 – 15 May 1897) was an early settler of South Australia, a cabinetmaker whose shop became Gay's Arcade and part of Adelaide Arcade.

Debney of Whitechapel, London, with his parents Robert and Margaretta Debney, née Rennie, and their small family emigrated to South Australia aboard Lloyds, arriving in Adelaide in December 1838. He farmed at The Reedbeds, and after making a small fortune as one of the fortunate "Snobs" group of investors in the Burra copper mines, purchased a fine property in Burnside and land at 103–105 Rundle Street (Section 84? 85?), where he opened a furniture factory, which soon won valuable contracts, including seating for the new Legislative Council chambers in 1855.

During this period his workshop was destroyed by fire, presumably from a candle left burning after the men, who had been working overtime, left the premises. His insurance was nowhere near sufficient to cover his losses, but despite the loss of materials, tools and facilities he was able to fill the contract satisfactorily. The work produced in his factory has been judged the colony's finest, with nearby Mayfield's a close second. Another prestigious contract was for furnishing a private suite in Government House for the Duke of Edinburgh during his 1867 Royal Visit.

Tragedy struck Debney: his wife Susanna (née Woodward) and daughter Matilda drowned in 1860 when their sailing boat capsized off Glenelg.

He was part owner, with James Woodforde, of Mundowdna Station and a licensed valuator. He served as Chairman of the Burnside Council for six years, and as undertaker for the most prestigious funerals. He was the first Adelaide employer to reduce his men's working day from ten to nine hours. In 1875 he sold his cabinetmaking business to Patrick Gay and in 1877 sold his Burnside property to Simpson Newland His Rundle Street property was sold in 1886 for £22,000.

He died at Gilberton; probably not destitute, but far from the wealthy man he had been.

== Family ==
George Robert Debney married Susanna Woodward in South Australia on 5 March 1839. She drowned in 1860.

- Robert Debney (1841–1864)
- George Leonard Debney (1843–1908) married Mary Jane Ross in 1871. He was partner until 1882 with George Chewings and Edwin Thomas Smith as "Chewings, Smith & Debney" graziers etc., died in Woodlands, near Bowen, Queensland.
- Matilda Debney (1846–1860)
- Frederic Debney (1847 – 14 September 1891) married Emily Harriet Stanford in 1875
- Alfred Debney (1849 – )
- Henry Woodward Debney (1851 – )

He married again, on 8 June 1861, to Ellen Elizabeth Turner (1833–1870). Ellen came to South Australia in 1852 and ran a school at Lyndoch. She wrote songs and poems, contributing, as "Ellie" and "Leila", to Adelaide papers and the Gawler Times.

- Stanley Turner Debney (1862 – 1926)
- Maude Debney (1870 – 1891) married Alfred Wilkinson in 1890

He married one more time, to Mary Watson on 9 March 1874. He had no further children.

A sister Margaretta ( –1885) married fellow Lloyds colonist John Edward Fielder ( –1903) shortly after arrival.

Another sister, Rebecca Sarah (c. 1810 – 12? July 1890) and her husband Willam Bulpitt (c. 1805 – 20 March 1845), also emigrated aboard Lloyds. Bulpitt had a furniture shop in Hindley Street, later on Rundle Street. Rebecca married again, in 1845, to Edward Moss (died 1869). She married one more time, in 1872, to Thomas Hawken (died 1890).
