= Ignatius Singer =

British writer and social reformer, died 1926

Ignatius Singer in 1898

Ignatius Singer (c. 1853–1926) was a British writer and speaker on scientific, economic, philological and theological topics during the late 19th and early 20th centuries. He was also an industrial chemist and innovator of textile technology. Born in Hungary, he settled in England and spent some years in Australia and New Zealand.

== Early life ==
From a Jewish family, Singer was born and educated in Budapest. He became a British subject around 1884.

Singer's Simplified Grammar of the Hungarian language was published in London in 1882 as part of Trübner's Collection of Simplified Grammars. The collection, devoted to the principal Asiatic and European languages, was edited by the English orientalist Edward Henry Palmer (1840-1882).

== Australia 1885–1891 ==
Reported as "just arrived from London" at Adelaide in February 1885, his first lecture in the colony was entitled "An Atheist's Apology and Defence". In a court case where he served as a witness, he refused to take the oath due to his atheism.

Singer had to "perform menial offices" to earn a living in South Australia. Soon after his arrival he was giving speeches and participating with demonstrations for the benefit of the labouring class. He was described as "really a clever man, notwithstanding that he looks so insignificant. He is a little, old-style chap, with a stoop, but having a splendid head and a keen bright eye... with his determined face and his grotesque headgear... Germanish from habit to dress, though he has more of the French politeness than the Teutonic gruffness." His speeches were found impressive, "but the drawback to his general acceptance as a speaker is the unintelligibility which a thick foreign accent imparts to him".

=== Campaigning ===
Working with Lewis Berens (1855–1913), Singer played a major part in establishing and editing a radical weekly journal, Our Commonwealth, a predecessor of The Herald of Adelaide. He became editor of this newspaper, which campaigned for social reform and rejected organised Christianity. Singer and Berens were instrumental also in founding the Adelaide Democratic Club in 1887.

About 1886, together with Berens and others, Singer began a campaign in Adelaide for the taxation of land values as advocated by Henry George, who visited Adelaide during 1890. Singer became known well in South Australia as a Single Taxer.

=== Wool cleaning device ===
While in Australia Singer developed a solvent scouring device using carbon bisulphide for cleaning sheep's wool. Later when back in England he installed this "very elaborate machine" at Messrs. Isaac Holden's works in Thornton Road, Bradford, and demonstrated it before the Society of Dyers and Colorists at Bradford Technical College. (Note: Mr Hiekson's memory was probably at fault in saying that this lecture was given in 1888.)

== Return to England ==
About 1891 Singer returned to England and settled in Yorkshire, as did Berens. Singer was "engaged in chemical works at Calverley, near Leeds" during the years prior to 1898. In 1893 he was working as a chemist in "an English cotton manufactory".

=== The Story of My Dictatorship (1893) ===
Singer and Berens jointly wrote The Story Of My Dictatorship (1893), a novel advocating tax reform. This was described as a "utopian novel clearly indicating Georgist influence", and sold more than 100,000 copies.

=== Some Unrecognized Laws of Nature (1897) ===
Singer and Berens also collaborated with Some Unrecognized Laws of Nature (1897), published in England by Messrs. John Murray.

The magazine The Dial said of this work that it "offers to the physicist greatly varied interest. Seldom does one find propositions more clearly enunciated or more concisely and logically discussed. Their exhaustive analysis holds attention and forces conclusions as to many of the terms and conventions of modern science, some of which have claimed the highest prerogative..." The magazine The New Age was reported to have "devoted seven columns of not altogether unfavourable criticism" to the book, claiming "That it propounds a new theory of heat, light, magnetism and electricity". The work also received an extensive review in the magazine Popular Science for October 1897, which regarded it as "a brave attempt to solve" the "riddle of the universe". According to this account, the book proposed the four fundamental physical principles of "persistence, resistance, reciprocity, and equalization". It addressed the "forbidden problem" of gravitation, asserting that the gravitational force between two bodies depended not only on their mass and the distance between them (as for the Newtonian description) but also in differences in the "state of excitation" of the bodies. A less favourable review in the magazine Knowledge (1 April 1898) condemned the book as "bristling with mistaken ideas".

== Australia and New Zealand 1898–1902 ==
In January 1898 Singer and Michael Flurscheim disembarked at Adelaide on their way to New Zealand, where they intended to settle. While in New Zealand Singer and Flurscheim established a factory and a loan society. An Ignatius Singer living in Stokes Valley patented a design for a milk churn in 1900. The two men returned to Europe in 1902.

== Later life and death ==
Singer worked as analytical chemist for the Bradford Dyers' Association. His paper on "The causes of the progress and retardation of the artificial color industry in England" was published in the Journal of the Society of Dyers and Colorists for May 1910.

Singer was said to be still "working as a chemist in Bradford" in 1917. His death was reported in the newspaper Yorkshire Observer of 8 June 1926. He had had one son Louis and one daughter Kathleen.

=== The Rival Philosophies... (1919) ===
Singer's 1917 booklet The Theocracy of Jesus was reviewed with apparent approval in the magazine The Humanist, which gave the work's message as follows: "As a theology Christianity stands self-condemned. As an ethical inspiration it has never been given a fair chance of success. Jesus was not a theologian, but a plain moral teacher,..."

In 1919 Singer expanded on this theme in his final major work, The Rival Philosophies of Jesus and of Paul. Here, he argued that the original message of Jesus had been distorted by Saint Paul and the Gospel writers. The book was received unfavourably by Jewish and Christian commentators. They emphasized that "Mr. Singer is not a professed theologian" and claimed that he was "totally ignorant of the subjects which he undertakes to treat", seeming to draw neither on "Judaism and Jewish literature" nor on "the literature of modern evangelical thinkers". One reviewer found the book "keen and suggestive, but dogmatic in spirit and crude in scholarship", while for another it was "hard to take some authors seriously. Mr. Singer is one of them. He puts before us, as new discoveries, theories that are hoary with old age..." The New Statesman had a different view, saying "We must be grateful to the author for his, at times, brilliant insistence on the truth that only by accepting the principles of Jesus can humanity work out its early destiny and establish a just and stable civilisation".

== Works ==
- Ignatius Singer (1882). Simplified Grammar of the Hungarian Language. London: Trübner & Co.
- Lewis Henry Berens; Ignatius Singer (1894). The Story of My Dictatorship. Sterling Publishing Company.
- Ignatius Singer; Lewis Henry Berens (28 August 2016) [1897]. Some Unrecognized Laws of Nature: An Inquiry Into the Causes of Physical Phenomena, with Special Reference to Gravitation. Wentworth Press. ISBN 978-1-372-39399-0.
- Ignatius Singer (1913). The Problem of "Life". London: C. W. Daniel.
- Ignatius Singer (24 May 2016) [1919]. The Rival Philosophies of Jesus and of Paul. BiblioLife. ISBN 978-1-359-24904-3. (Note: Strangely spelt "Jeesus" in Foyle's catalogue.)
