= J. T. Fitch & Son =

Store in Adelaide, South Australia

J. T. Fitch & Son was an Adelaide drapery store established by John Thomas Fitch, and carried on by his son John Thomas Fitch, jr.

== History ==
John Thomas Fitch (1825 – 15 May 1902) was born in Leigh, Essex or Gravesend, and served his apprenticeship with the Leicester Square drapery firm of Stagg & Mantle. a son of Elizabeth Pinder Fitch (c. 1801 – 28 May 1869 in Adelaide). He arrived in South Australia aboard James Gibb in October 1850 with his wife Caroline Mary and two children. He worked as a commercial traveller for Goode Brothers, then in 1857 established his own store "London and Manchester Warehouse" opposite York Hotel, Rundle Street By 1860 they had moved to 141–145 Rundle Street, at the Pulteney Street intersection, "Fitch's Corner". In 1880, at a time of recession, Fitch purchased the stock of competitors C. Beeton, H. E. Cohen and J. F. Clark, and took over the lease of Mrs. Balthazar's shoe shop next door. Unlike other drapery stores such as Charles Birks & Co., Fitch never ventured into other retail goods, apart from boots and shoes. In 1890 the store expanded further by purchasing the lease of R. Wilson's grocery store at 155 Rundle Street.

John Thomas Fitch (1851 – 19 June 1924) was educated at J. L. Young's Adelaide Educational Institution, and later attended St. Peter's College, and joined his father's business in 1864. Like his father, who had no interest in politics and whose interests outside business seem to have been limited to membership of the voluntary militia, his outside interests were the Adelaide Literary Society and the North Adelaide Young Men's Society, and later took to the game of lawn bowls, serving as chairman of the Adelaide Oval Bowls Club.

Two sons of J. T. Fitch, jun, Harold and Frank were involved in the business, and in 1925, after the death of their father, founded with drapers Frederick William Miller, Charles Edward Martin and lawyer Oswald Hunter, J. T. Fitch Ltd., a limited liability company, to take over the company's assets and operate the business. Frank retired around 1914.

A second storey was added to the rear section of the premises in 1914, and plans for further expansion were made in 1926 but in September 1927 the business closed; its merchandise was purchased by John Martin's and "Martin's Building" became in 1928 home to John Reid & Sons' furniture showrooms.

== Family ==
John Thomas Fitch (1825 – 15 May 1902) married Caroline Mary Lamburn ( – 24 January 1858)

- Samuel Fitch (before 1850 – 1851)
- John Thomas Fitch (1851 – 19 June 1924) married Agnes Waddell Gay (c. 1854 – 19 March 1913) on 10 May 1876. They had a home on LeFevre Terrace, North Adelaide. Agnes was sister of cabinetmaker Patrick Gay, of Gay's Arcade fame.

- Harold Gay Fitch (1877 – 1964) married Eva Martha Wright ( –1952) on 17 May 1906. He was the founder of Fitch's Rubber Store, originally of 24, Adelaide Arcade, later of suburban Hindmarsh.
- C(aroline) Ethel Fitch (1879 – ) married Albert Clement Finlayson on 25 April 1907. Albert was a son of Robert Kettle Finlayson.
- Frank Lamburn Fitch (1880 – 1960) was general secretary of Crippled Children's Association of South Australia.
- Tom Osborne Fitch (1882 – ) married Florence Edith Clark in Fremantle, Western Australia on 18 October 1905
- Alice Isabel Fitch (1884 – ) married Percival Rudolph Stone on 11 March 1908
- Eric Gay Fitch (1889 – 1970) married Muriel May Dixon on 15 September 1922
- Lois Agnes Fitch (1891 – ) married Leslie Roy Hill on 15 October 1914
- F(lorence) Dorothy Fitch (1893 – ) married Edward Gilbert Bagshaw on 21 September 1922

- Elizabeth Caroline Fitch (17 May 1853 – 15 March 1858)
- Alice Fitch (31 October 1855 – ) married Robert Hugh Crawford on 28 July 1880
- Florence "Florrie" Fitch (15 January 1858 – ) married Evan Cottier Clucas on 11 June 1902
