= Bhoot Aaya =

Indian horror docu television series

- Created by: Akashdeep Sabir
- Written by: Manjit Khatoda; Shaheen Iqbal
- Directed by: Ayush Raina
- Creative director: Akashdeep
- Country of origin: India
- Original language: Hindi
- No. of seasons: 1
- No. of episodes: 23 (list of episodes)

Production
- Producer: Akashdeep Sabir
- Editor: Nihal Ahmed
- Camera setup: Multi camera
- Running time: 30 minutes
- Production company: Cinetek Telefilms Pvt. Ltd.

Original release
- Network: Sony Entertainment Television
- Release: 13 October 2013 – 6 April 2014

Bhoot Aaya (transl. Ghost has come) is an Indian drama documentary television series created by Akashdeep Sabir and directed by Ayush Raina for Sony Entertainment Television. Its central plot was based on paranormal experiences narrated by the real victims. The series was scheduled to telecast on 29 September 2013. But it was delayed, the series premiered on 13 October 2013 and ended on 6 April 2014.

== Plot ==
Bhoot Aaya attempted to explore the unexplained forces of the dark world and their encounters with humans. It was based on human psychology and examined whether belief in ghosts is innate. The show depicted real-life, spine-chilling experiences of ordinary people. Each episode of Bhoot Aaya featured Gaurav Tiwari and other experts from the Indian Paranormal Society, who explained the reasons behind such unexplained events.

== Cast ==
- Karanvir Bohra
- Teejay Sendhu

== Episode list ==
Episode number	Episode title	Air date
1	Black Magic	13 October 2013
2	Haunted House	20 October 2013
3	Spirit of a Lover	27 October 2013
4	Possessed Girl	3 November 2013
5	Plan Chart	10 November 2013
6	Fight Against the Dark	17 November 2013
7	Double Marriage	24 November 2013
8	Evil Spirit	1 December 2013
9	Spirit of Wife	8 December 2013
10	The Spirit Rises	15 December 2013
11	Forbidden Land	22 December 2013
12	Happy (!) New Year	29 December 2013
13	Killer Spirit	5 January 2014
14	Haunted House of Goa	12 January 2014
15	House of Dead Child	19 January 2014
16	Deadly Forest	2 February 2014
17	Haunted Desert	9 February 2014
18	Darr @ The Hill Station	23 February 2014
19	Kaala Jadu	2 March 2014
20	The Treasure Guard	9 March 2014
21	Fear Inside	16 March 2014
22	Dark Spirits	23 March 2014
23	Mayajaal	6 April 2014
