= Adelaide Arcade =

Shopping arcade in Adelaide, Australia

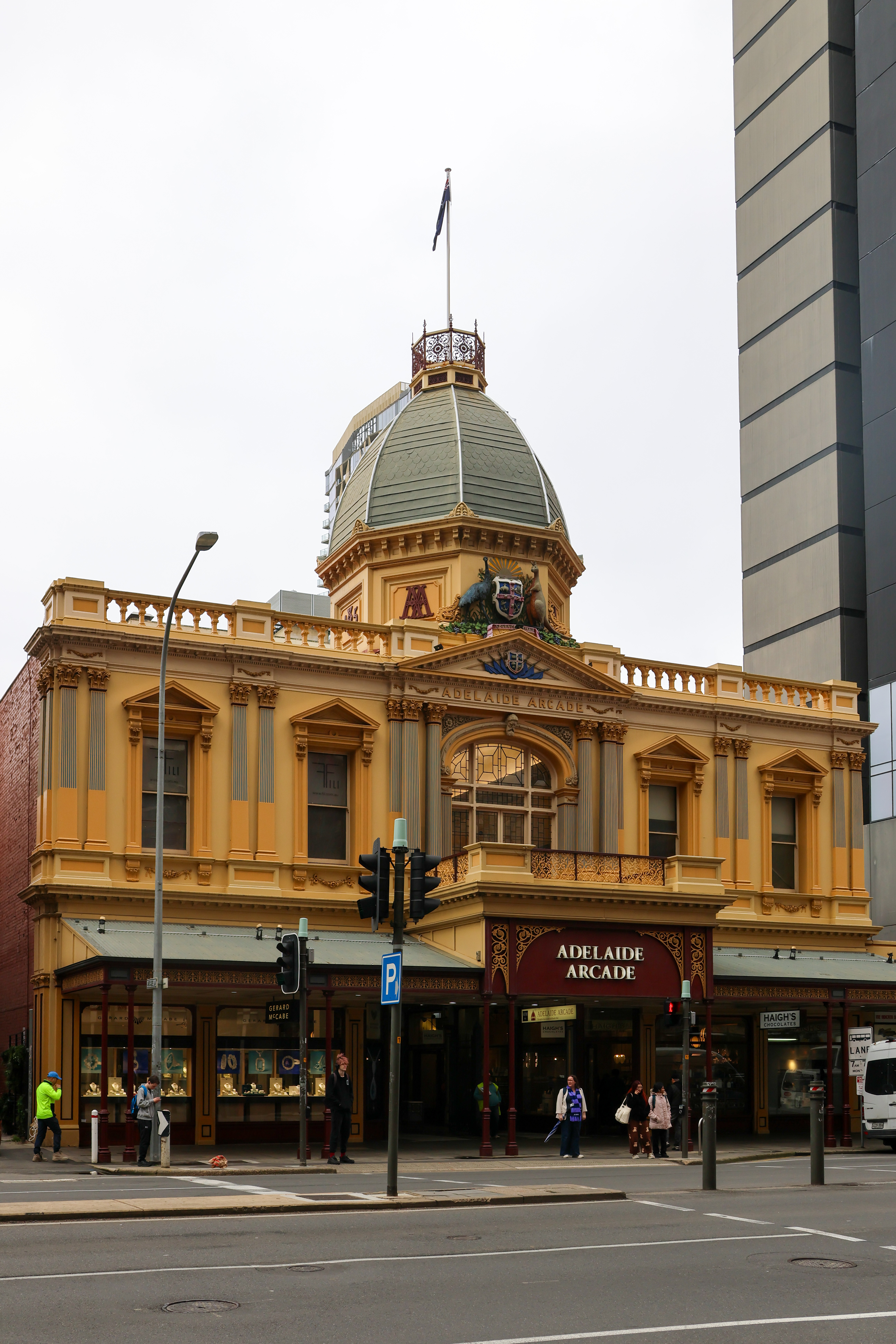
- Grenfell Street entrance in 2026

General information
- Type: Shopping arcade
- Architectural style: Italianate
- Location: 111–117 Rundle Mall, Adelaide, South Australia, Australia
- Coordinates: 34.9235°S 138.6038°E
- Groundbreaking: 6 May 1885
- Completed: 1885
- Opened: 12 December 1885
- Client: Adelaide Arcade Company Ltd

Technical details
- Material: Brick and cement
- Floor count: 2

Design and construction
- Architecture firm: Withall & Wells
- Main contractor: W. Pett & Son

Website
- adelaidearcade.com.au

South Australian Heritage Register
- Official name: Adelaide and Gay's Arcades
- Designated: 14 February 1985
- Reference no.: 10795

Adelaide Arcade is a heritage shopping arcade in the centre of Adelaide, South Australia. It is linked to, and closely associated with, Gay's Arcade.

== History ==
The property on which the Arcade was built was the scene of two disastrous fires: the first was George Debney's fine furniture factory and showrooms at 103–105 Rundle Street (parts of Section 84 and 85), which was destroyed, along with a great deal of stock and raw material, on the evening of 16 July 1855.

Patrick Gay, who had been working for Debney, took over the business in 1867. He also took over the cabinetmaking business next door, owned by his father, also named Patrick Gay.

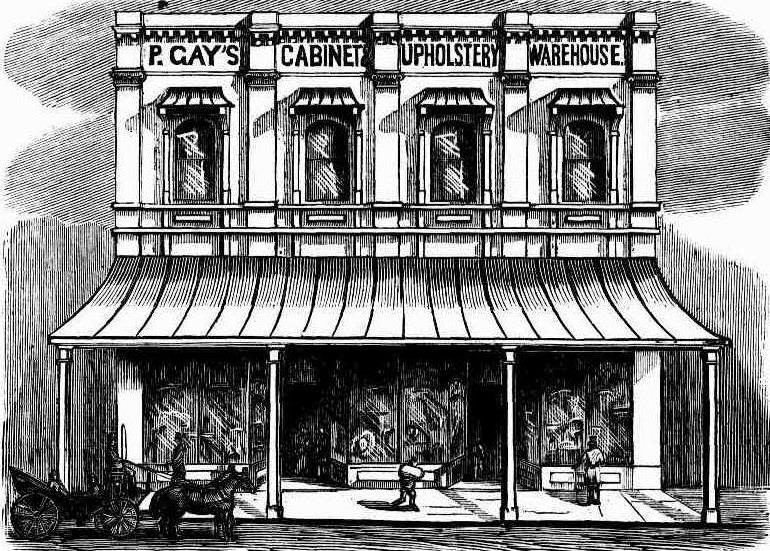
Gay's Warehouse 1880

In 1880 the warehouse had a 52 ft frontage to Rundle Street and extended halfway to Grenfell Street. The rear half, which Gay had enlarged to three storeys, extended to Twin street, so the property was L-shaped, the remaining portion at the corner of Twin and Rundle streets being occupied by James Calder's City Steam Biscuit Factory.

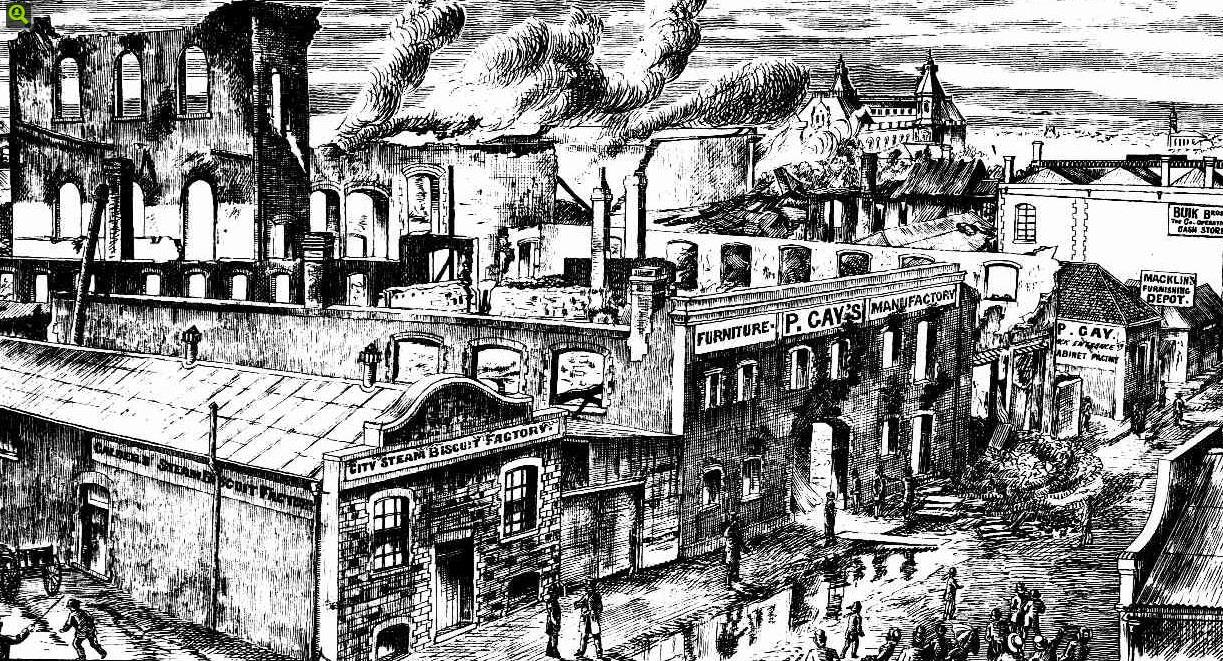
Gay's Warehouse after the fire 1884

The premises were completely destroyed by fire on Saturday 15 November 1884. The shop had been closed around 2:30 pm, and first signs of smoke noticed around 9 pm, and a fire hose deployed around 10. Without any evidence, the newspapers assumed arson ("incendiarists"), perhaps thinking of a disgruntled ex-employee, as Gay had the previous year sacked some of his work-force in response to the economic downturn, and those remaining were on short hours. Though it was conceivable that someone in Baker & Chambers' Sturt Stables, between the rear of Gay's factory and Grenfell Street could have been responsible, there was no evidence to support arson. All witnesses insisted Gay maintained good relations with all employees, past and present, and there was no enmity between his English and German workmen, who were on equal pay rates. The insurance payout was enough to start again, but insufficient to cover losses.

=== Adelaide Arcade ===
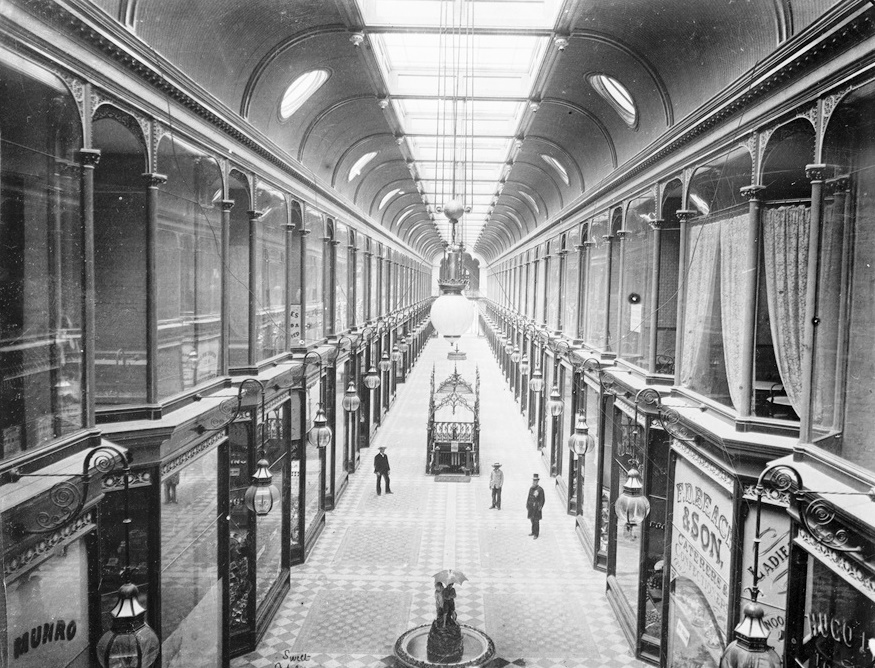
Adelaide Arcade 1886 photo

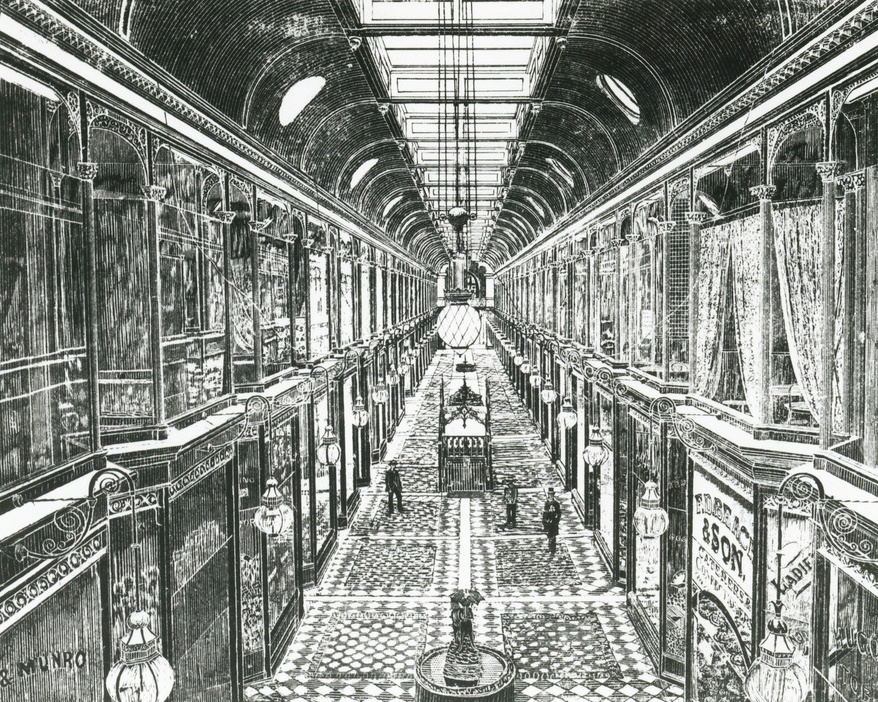
The Arcade 1886 engraving

A Syndicate was formed consisting largely of Emanuel Cohen, J. M. Wendt, Patrick Gay, Saul Solomon, and L. H. Berens to erect a shopping arcade linking Rundle and Grenfell streets, the largest in the Southern Hemisphere. Withall & Wells were selected as architects and W. Pett and Son as contractors.

In 1885 F. J. Beck & Co. purchased both Baker & Chambers' property, "Sturt Horse Bazaar" and Debney's land, the site of Gay's burnt-out furniture factory, to lease to the proponents of the Arcade. (The Rundle Street end consisted of two portions of sections 84 and 85, each of 53 ft 9 ins frontage, the eastern portion previously owned by Debney and leased to Gay.) Baker & Chambers moved their business to Currie Street, previously the John Bull Livery Stables.
In September 1885 F. J. Beck offered 50 year leases on two Grenfell Street properties not needed for the Arcades:90 by 90 feet (27 m × 27 m) adjoining Twin Street and 54 by 180 feet (16 m × 55 m) the other side of the Arcade.

It would have a frontage of 77 feet to Rundle Street and 97 feet to Grenfell Street, and possessed a right-of-way 12 feet wide along the whole length of the western side, and an entrance to Twin Street on the eastern side. The additional twenty feet on the eastern side of the Grenfell Street entrance was occupied by a Victorian Turkish baths complex conducted by C. Bastard and F. Needham. (T. Bastard had the Public Baths on King William Road from 1861.) The arcade had a promenade 24 feet wide, the flooring material Carrara marble and black and white encaustic tiles in mosaic patterns, with 44 shops lining the arcade, each 15 feet (4.6 m) wide by 24 feet (7.3 m) feet deep, with 15 foot ceilings. The fronts of the shops and showrooms over in the arcade constructed entirely of open wood and iron framing, glazed with polished plate glass, and broken up in outline into identical bays.

Originally each of the 50 shops had a room on the upper floor directly overhead, for use as a workroom or similar, presumably with its own staircase. Later, as exists today, a balcony-style walkway was installed at the upper level on either side, and many of these rooms became separate shops.

Entrances on Rundle and Grenfell streets were 19 feet (5.8 m) wide, flanked by larger shops, their fronts returning into the entrances. The slabs at the entrances were of Kapunda marble.

The elevations, similar on both Rundle and Grenfell streets, were of Italian style; the lower half dominated by the glass shop-fronts and arcade entrances, protected by verandahs supported by decorative iron columns, with a square balcony at the centre, behind which was an octagonal tower and dome, bearing an Australian coat-of-arms (not the coat of arms — Federation was still 15 years away, but the design used bore a strong resemblance to that ultimately chosen). Inside, the ceiling featured wide cornices constructed of moulded galvanized iron, and the upper cornices being surmounted by a deep cove finished with panelled soffit, returning down the cove and across the ceiling, which is broken up into a series of deeply recessed panelled bays, glazed with diapered and coloured glass. Additional sunlight was supplied by circular bullseye lights in alternate bays of the cove. Special attention was devoted to the lighting and ventilation, the latter provided by air tunnels and shafts connected with the towers.

Lighting at night was provided by sixteen Siemens arc lamps, each fitting having six carbon electrodes requiring replacement after 18 hours' service, the large glass globular fittings being suspended by a cables with pulleys to facilitate lowering for maintenance. Three-phase power for the lights was provided by a pair of Siemens alternators, belt driven from an Otto Crossley gas engine with a pair of one-ton flywheels. This equipment was housed in a separate engine room on the ground floor. This was only four years after the historic implementation of a similar system in Godalming. Gas lamps by Strode & Co. of London were provided external to each shop for illumination in the event of generator failure, or for decorative purposes.

Three fountains were erected in the promenade, and an underground tea-room was provided, as well as toilet facilities more than adequate for the expected large clientele.
Colonial material was used as far as possible, external walls being entirely of local bricks (2 million in total from the Metropolitan Brick Company, owned by Wendt) and faced with Portland cement.

The contract, for somewhat over £30,000, was signed on 29 April 1885. and the foundation stone laid by Mayor Bundey on 6 May 1885. Shareholders in addition to directors Solomon, Wendt, Cohen, Gay and Berens were Robert Carr Castle and Hermann Carl Koeppen Wendt.

Defying the sceptics, the building was opened on Saturday 12 December 1885 by the Governor Sir William Robinson. It would have been completed by the promised date of 1 December but for late delivery of some imported items. The quantity of glass involved was prodigious: 50,000 square feet (4,600 m^{2}), of which more than 30,000 square feet (2,800 m^{2}) was polished plate glass.

The Arcade was built at a time of an economic downturn, and it was very difficult to attract paying tenants. A year's rent holiday was offered to suitable clients. Return on capital was so low that one-by-one the various subscribers relinquished their shares to Wendt, who by 1906 was the sole owner. Other accounts have the company going into liquidation and the assets being purchased by Wendt from the liquidator.

=== Gay's Arcade ===
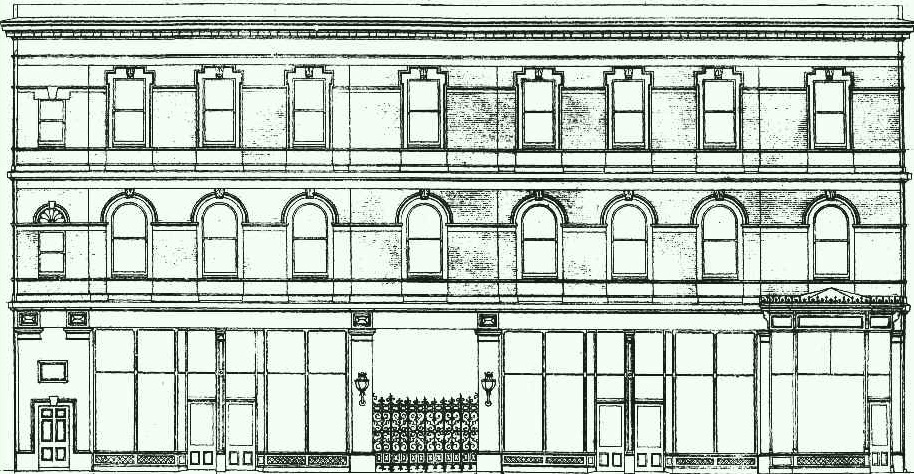
Gay's Arcade frontage Twin Street, Adelaide

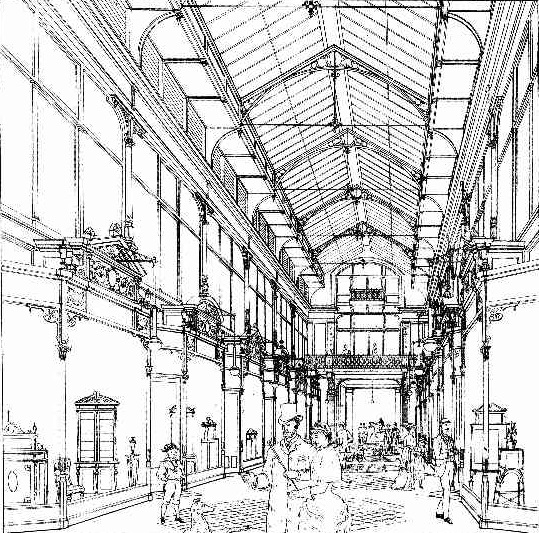
Promenade, Gay's Arcade

The Adelaide Arcade construction was well underway when a separate, though connected, venture was embarked on: a short arcade of similar design, between Twin Street and Adelaide Arcade close to its centre.

In August 1885, just a few months after engaging architect and builder for the Adelaide Arcade, a different architect, James Cumming (c. 1825–1901), and contractor, Nicholas Wallis Trudgen (c. 1829–1892) were engaged for the extension, to be named Gay's Arcade.

Gay's Arcade as designed had a frontage of 100 feet (30 m) to Twin Street and a depth of 119 feet (36 m) to Adelaide Arcade. The building on Twin Street would have three storeys, plus cellars, with five shops on the ground floor, with Gay's furniture store and workshops on the two upper floors. The passage through this building then opens up into an arcade of two storeys containing twelve shops, having carved wooden frames for plate-glass windows, all very similar to the Adelaide Arcade. The fronts of these shops to be chiefly plate-glass, with light wooden frames enclosed in ornamental cast-iron work. The roof would be of glass in metal sashes, with ample provision for ventilation, and the walkway paved with encaustic tiles, marble, and Mintaro slate. Where lighting in the main arcade was to be electric arc-lamps, in Gay's Arcade it would be by "Wenham" gas-lights, a recent innovation. This emphasis on lighting was a result of insistence by insurance companies that gas lighting for drapers shops' displays be outside the windows, another impetus for incandescent electric lighting, which became general around 1900. Gay was to occupy the two upper floors of the block building and one side of the arcade. As there is a right-of-way along the north side of the building, and a light court was reserved on the south side, adequate natural light was provided, and the shops had back entrances. "Wenham" gaslights were provided for illumination of the arcade in the evening.

== Later history ==
With the death of Wendt, his legatees sold the Adelaide Arcade lease to two Adelaide industrialists: T. E. Crompton and one Simpson. Perhaps Alfred Allen Simpson (1875–1939) or Frederick Neighbour Simpson (1877–1954), who were related to Crompton by marriage.

Those gentlemen later sold it to a consortium of Charles Angel (c. 1877–1943), (Malcolm Eric) Angus Scott (–1951) and Captain Johann George Arnold (c. 1863–1949).

Gay's Arcade was owned by J. R. Skipper in 1955–56 when alterations were supervised by architect Bevan Rutt.

The arcade grew to over 100 shops through the addition of a balcony area in the 1960s.

On 3 August 1980, a fire started in Gay's Arcade, which was largely destroyed, and smoke and other damage extended to Adelaide Arcade, which was closed to the public for over a week.

On 21 October 1980, the building was listed on the now-defunct Register of the National Estate. On 14 February 1985, it was listed on the South Australian Heritage Register.

== Hauntings ==
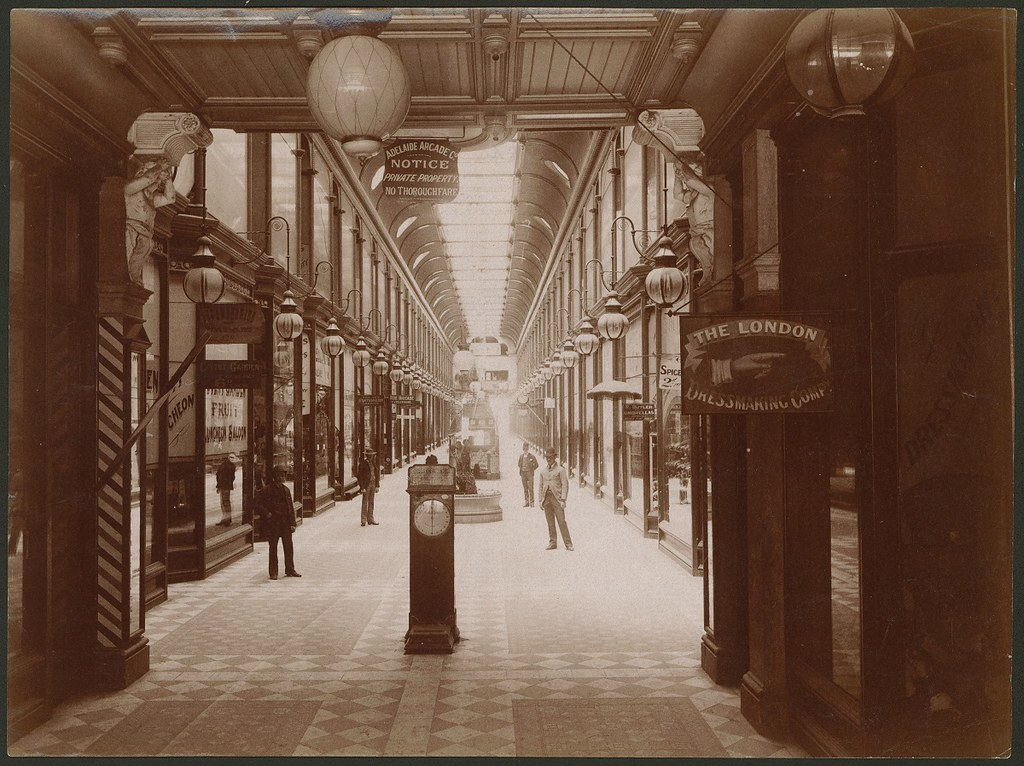
Interior of the Adelaide Arcade, 1892

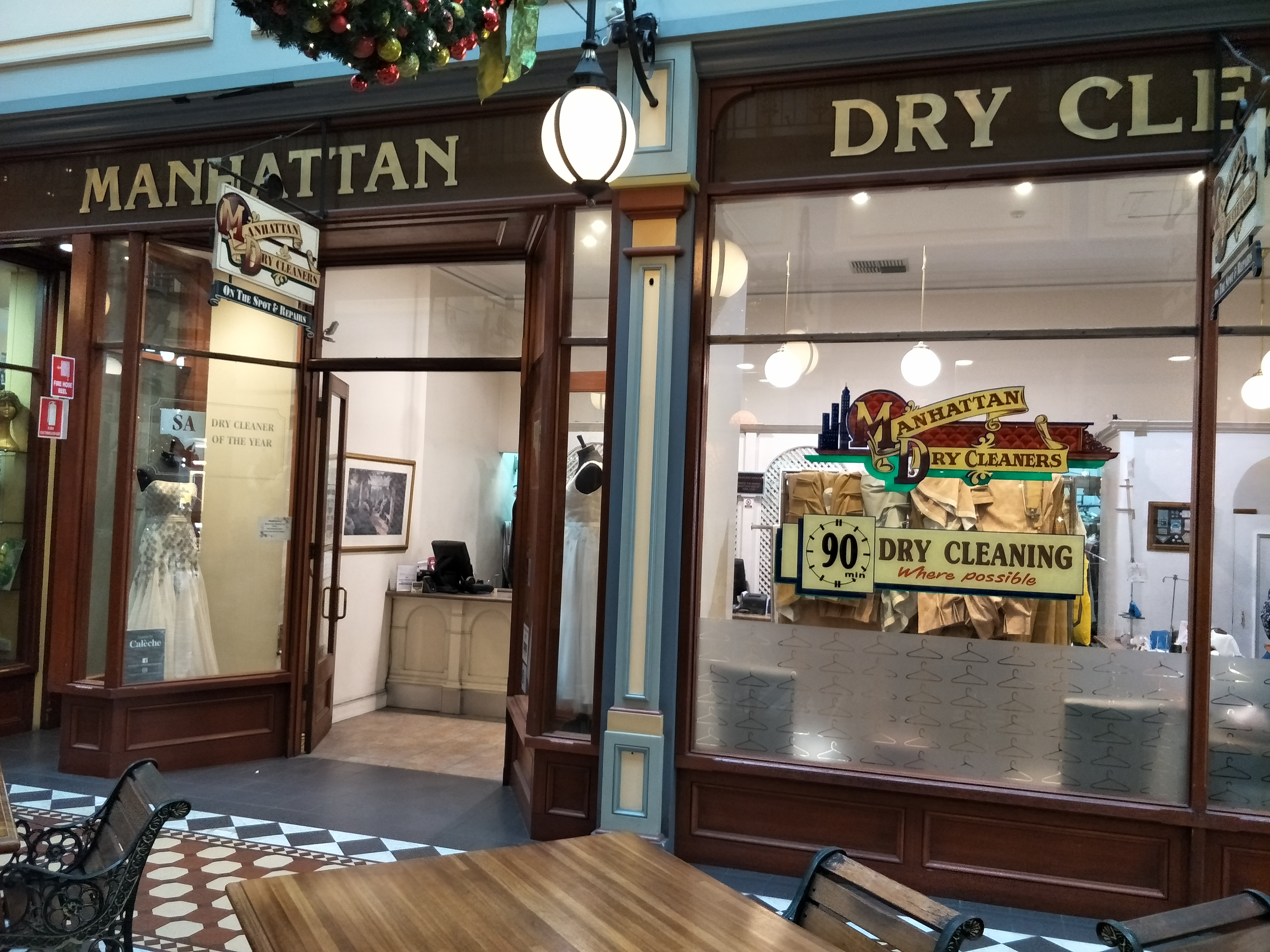
The site where Francis Cluney's body was found

The arcade is said to be haunted. Television show Haunting: Australia conducted the first ever official paranormal investigation of the Adelaide Arcade in 2013. The episode aired on Syfy Australia as episode 5 of the series. The episode features local paranormal historian, and recipient of the 2017 South Australian Emerging Historian of the Year Award, Allen Tiller. Haunting: Australia aired to a global audience via networks such as REALLY on UKTV and SYFY in USA.

=== Francis Cluney ===
Francis Cluney was an early beadle (caretaker) of the Arcade, who died in its engine room on 21 June 1887. He had become entangled with one of the two great flywheels of the gas engine that by belts drove the two alternators. Cluney had been deputised by the Arcade electrician H. Harcourt, who wished to visit the Jubilee Exhibition, to keep an eye on the plant but on no account to touch the machinery. It was conjectured that he slipped on floor of the engine-room; not unlikely as such floors are notoriously slippery. The engine room is reported to have become a dry cleaners shop.

His ghost was claimed to have been recorded on security camera footage in 2008. Footsteps and strange sounds have also been heard within the ceiling spaces, the rooftop and the dome of the arcade – all believed to be Francis Cluney.

=== Florence Horton ===
Shop 50 of the arcade is said to be haunted by the ghost of Florence Horton, a local woman who was walking down Rundle Street with two friends and was shot three times in the back by her estranged husband Thomas Horton on Saturday 27 February 1904. Florence was carried into a tobacconist, (now Koko Black/Shop 50 in the arcade), where she died soon after.

=== Sydney Kennedy Byron ===
Three year old Sydney Kennedy Byron died under unknown circumstances in the Regent Arcade, near the Adelaide Arcade, on the 10 or 11 January 1902. Sydney's mother, Bridget Lauretta Kennedy Byron, more commonly known as 'Madame Kennedy' a palm reader who worked from a shop front of the Adelaide Arcade, was tried but later acquitted of smothering the boy to death. She died six months later after drinking herself to death. Her body was found in the west parklands. The ghosts of Sydney and Bridget are said to haunt the alley between the Regent and Adelaide Arcades.

== Gallery ==
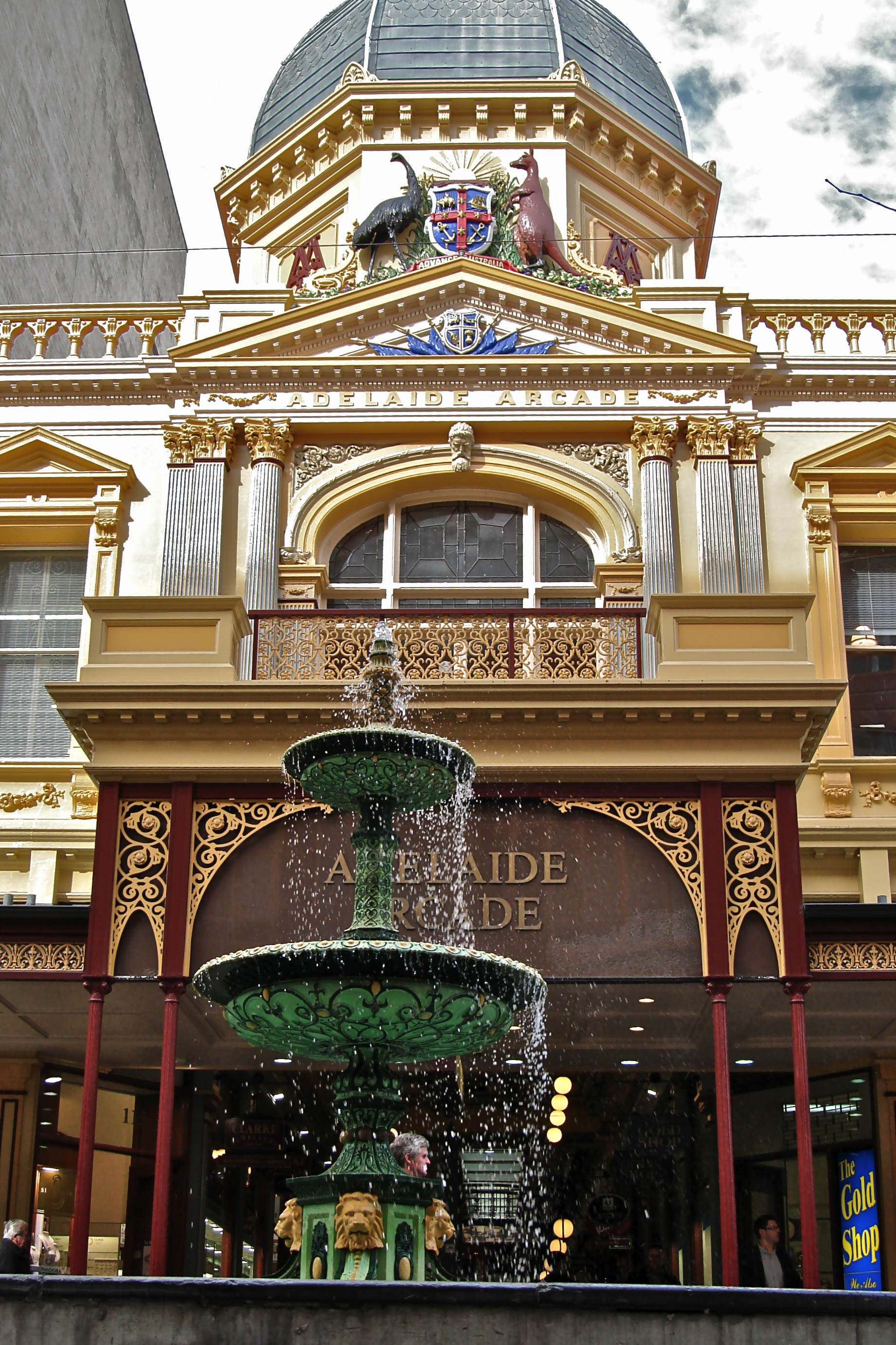
Rundle Mall entrance

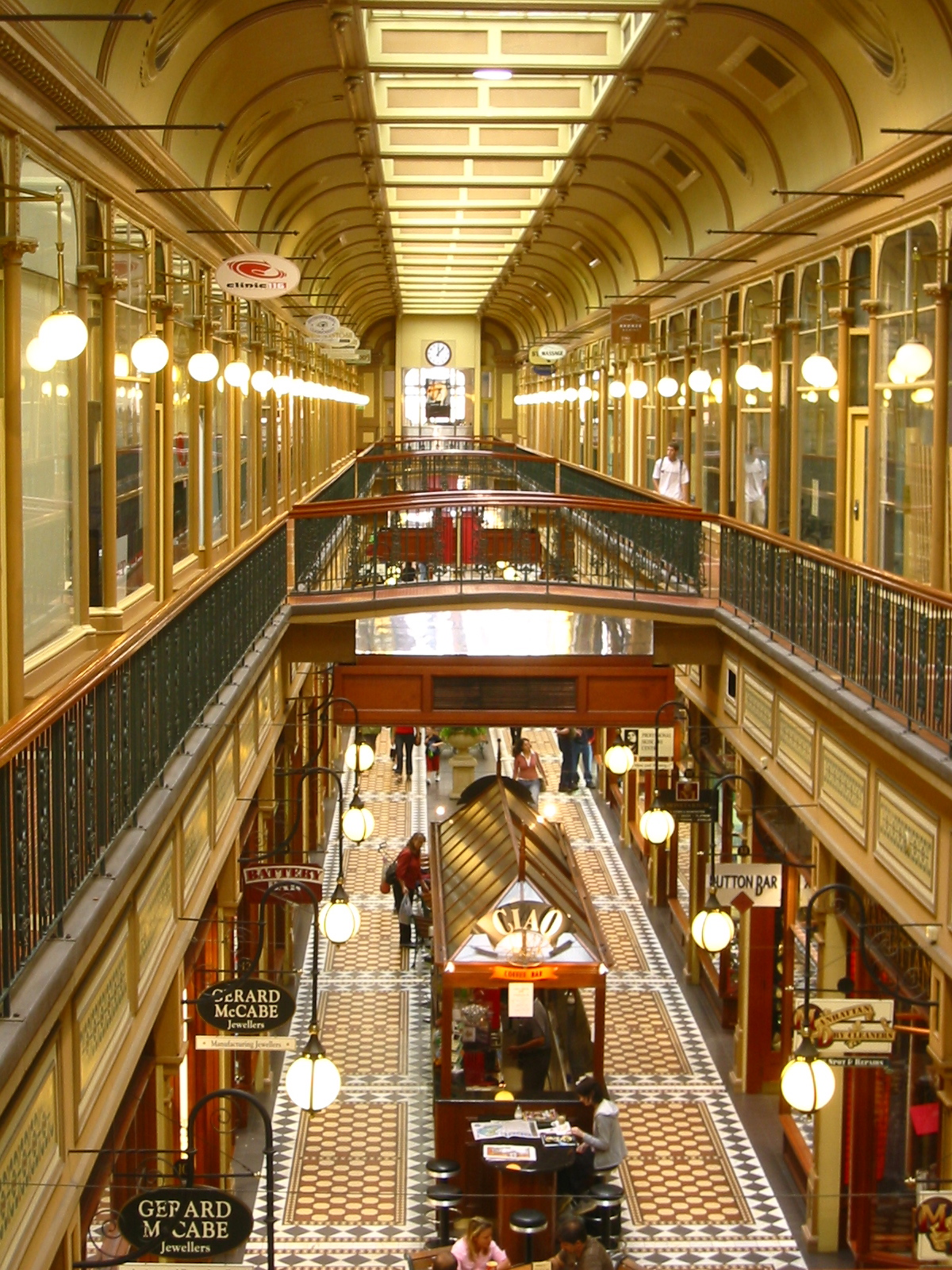
Interior of Adelaide Arcade

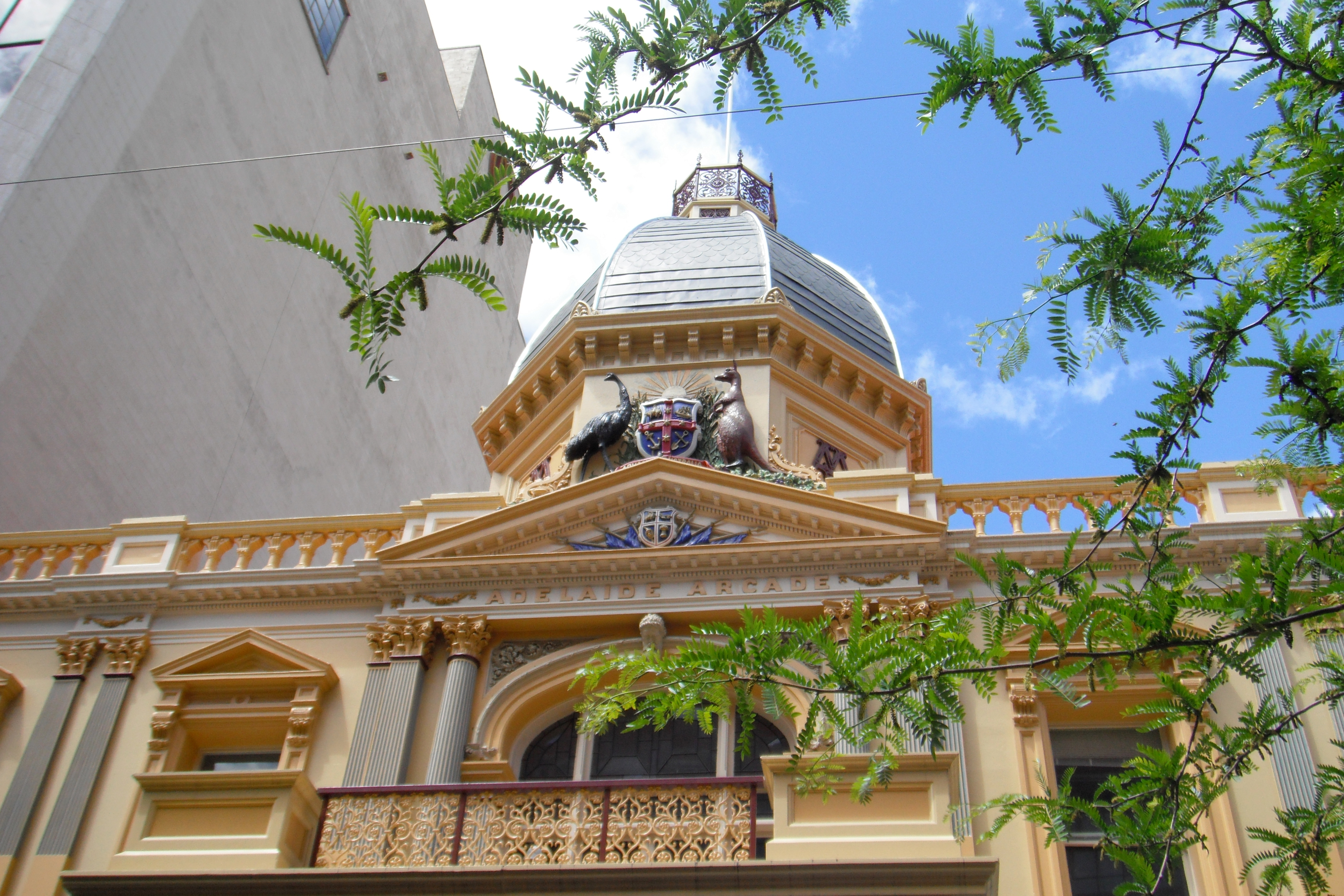
Façade above the Rundle Mall entrance

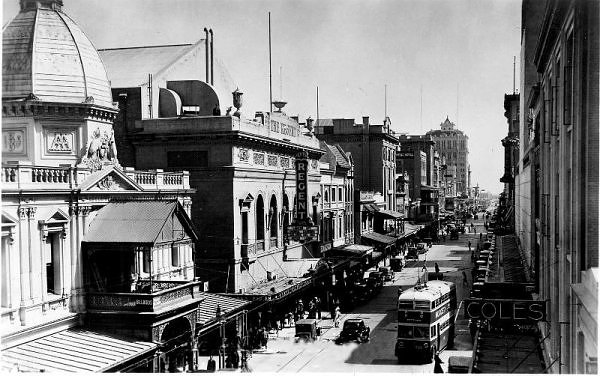
Rundle Street in 1938

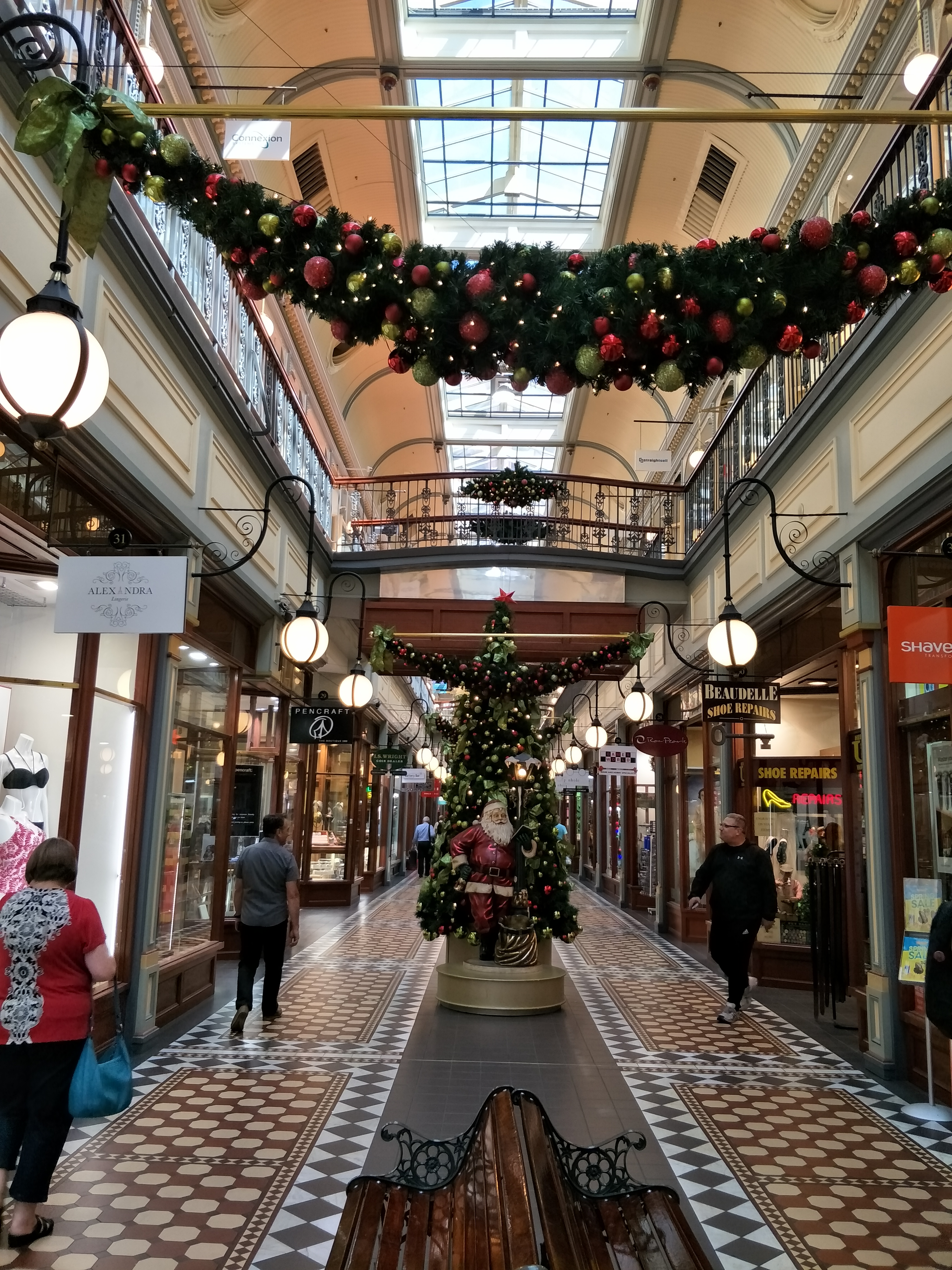
Adelaide Arcade during the 2017 Christmas period
