= Living with the Dead (TV series) =

British television series

- Genre: Paranormal reality
- Country of origin: United Kingdom
- Original language: English
- No. of seasons: 2
- No. of episodes: 16

Production
- Running time: 60 minutes

Original release
- Network: Living
- Release: 6 May 2008 – 5 May 2009

Living with the Dead is a British television programme about a team of paranormal investigators who investigate ghostly goings on and supernatural occurrences in family homes around Britain. The team aim to resolve the paranormal activity for the family concerned. While mainly focused on ordinary family homes, investigations in celebrity homes such as comedian Freddie Starr's occasionally feature.

Each run comprises 8 sixty-minute episodes. Now into its second series, the show airs on the Virgin Media Television satellite channel Living, plus Australian and Canadian channels.

== Team ==
The team consists of American-born medium Johnnie Fiori, exorcist & psychic Medium Ian Lawman, historian Hallie Rubenhold and paranormal researcher Stephen Griffiths; who work together with the families living in allegedly haunted homes to remove the evil and terrifying spirits that plague them.

Each team member has a distinct role. Johnnie Fiori's is to assess the paranormal activity as well as spending the night at the home. In his role to resolve the issues, Ian Lawman draws on a range on methods including séances. Historian Hallie Rubenhold, explores local history surrounding the house to uncover any macabre events that may lie behind the hauntings. Fiori cites the investigation at Saddleworth as a favourite, while Lawman cites the one at Blackpool as particularly enthralling.

== Production ==
In July 2009, series one investigator Mark Webb published e-mails on his website, in a post questioning the authenticity of the programme's mediums Lawman and Fiori with claims they were given full information several days before filming took place.

For series two, Mark Webb was replaced by investigator Stephen Griffiths who had previously assisted with research and made an appearance in series one (The Ghost in the Attic).

Original Productions UK, the London arm of Los Angeles-based Original Productions, produce the series. Each episode is sixty minutes. The series premiered with an eight-part run, in the first quarter of 2008. It received sufficiently warm reception that a second series was commissioned, broadcast from April 2009. Through syndication, it began airing in April 2009 on Australia's CI channel. From October 2009, the series also airs in Canada on CTV.

== Episodes ==
=== Season 1 (2008) ===
No. overall	No. in season	Title	Location	Original release date
1	1	"The Haxby Strangler"	Haxby	6 May 2008
Mediums Johnnie Fiori and Ian Lawman and investigator Mark Webb attempt to help people deal with paranormal activity in their homes, beginning with terrified family in Haxby, York.
2	2	"Killer in the Courthouse"	Slough	13 May 2008
Mediums Johnnie Fiori and Ian Lawman and psychic investigator Mark Webb visit a pub in Slough that was formerly an 18th-century courthouse. The owners were almost killed in a mysterious fire and also report ghostly lights and noises.
3	3	"The Ghost in the Attic"	Derbyshire	20 May 2008
The team discover an antique chair in the attic could be the source of more than 20 years of paranormal activity and sightings of a ghostly young girl at a Derbyshire house.
4	4	"The Haunted Photo"	Dre-fach Felindre	27 May 2008
Mediums Johnnie Fiori and Ian Lawman and psychic investigator Mark Webb attempt to help people deal with problems caused by paranormal activity in their homes
5	5	"The Haunted Tunnel"	Somerset	3 June 2008
Johnnie Fiori, Ian Lawman and Mark Webb investigate an apparent case of possession linked to an ancient tunnel in the garden of a family home in Somerset.
6	6	"The Gift and the Curse"	Peak District	10 June 2008
Mediums Johnnie Fiori and Ian Lawman and psychic investigator Mark Webb visit a picturesque house in the Peak District where spooky goings-on have left the owners terrified.
7	7	"The Grimsby Scratcher"	Grimsby	17 June 2008
Mediums Johnnie Fiori and Ian Lawman and psychic investigator Mark Webb come to the aid of a Grimsby couple terrified for the safety of their family.
8	8	"Children of the Plague" (Celebrity Special)	Private Residence.	24 June 2008
The team visit the home of actress and singer Toyah Willcox in an attempt to exorcise paranormal activity connected to 15th-century criminal monks at nearby Pershore Abbey

=== Season 2 (2009) ===
No. overall	No. in season	Title	Location	Original release date
9	1	"Possession Freddie Starr"	Private Residence.	17 March 2009
Comedian Freddie Starr invites mediums Johnnie Fiori and Ian Lawman and paranormal investigator Stephen Griffiths to rid his home of two ghosts.
10	2	"The Ghosts of Fobbing"	Fobbing	24 March 2009
Johnnie Fiori, Ian Lawman and Stephen Griffiths visit the Essex town of Fobbing to investigate reports of paranormal activity.
11	3	"Blackness in Blackpool"	Blackpool	31 March 2009
Mediums Johnnie Fiori and Ian Lawman and paranormal investigator Stephen Griffiths attempt to help people deal with problems caused by paranormal activity in their homes.
12	4	"Lost Souls of Saddleworth"	Saddleworth	7 April 2009
The team visits the home of Saddleworth residents Jeanne and Bob Thomas, who are convinced the property is plagued by evil spirits
13	5	"Restless Spirits"	Private Residence	14 April 2009
Bad Girls actor Claire King invites Johnnie Fiori, Ian Lawman and Stephen Griffiths into her 17th-century farmhouse to search for signs of paranormal activity.
14	6	"What Lies Beneath"	Hereford	21 April 2009
Exorcist Ian Lawman and Sensitive Johnnie Fiori visit a 16th-century farmhouse in Hereford to carry out an investigation into a spate of hauntings that have terrorised the family living there. All seems to be going well for the team until Johnnie discovers that someone has been dabbling with black magic.
15	7	"Manor House of Horror"	Weymouth	28 April 2009
The team explores a manor house that has been owned by the same family since the 18th century, and the investigation yields unexpected results.
16	8	"Where Spirits Lurk"	Orpington	5 May 2009
Last in the series. The Team explore a 1930s home in Orpington, Kent, where two young girls are tormented by a dark entity.
