= Adelaide Crystal Ice Company =

Australian ice manufacturing business

Adelaide Crystal Ice Company was a South Australian ice manufacturing business founded in 1879 which started manufacturing "Alaska" ice cream in 1915 and in 1922 founded the Alaska Ice Cream Company.

== History ==
The company was formed in 1879 by Logan, Weber, Barnfield, Lawrance and others and installed American ice-making machinery at their premises, the old Ebenezer Chapel off the east end of Rundle Street.

Built for the Congregational Church in 1851 by William Peacock, and for which Ebenezer Place was named, it was used by John L. Young for his Adelaide Educational Institution in 1851, and 1870–71 by the "East Adelaide School for Children of the Poorest Class". The "Peacock Chapel", as it was sometimes called, has been named as the building used by William Charlick for his grain and fodder store, attached to the East End Market.

The company had offices in Gresham Chambers, King William Street (later in Eagle Chambers, Pirie Street), and a depot in Thebarton. They had ten carts delivering ice to all suburbs, also by paddle-steamer to River Murray towns as far as Wentworth. In 1881 the machinery was moved to Thebarton, where their production capacity was 50 tons a week.

In 1880 the company bought out a rival company and sold its refrigeration plant to a Queensland meat processing business. A second machine was purchased in 1881.

Almost from the outset, the company diversified into other products, some of which seem to bear little relation to the core business of ice-making. The motive behind this decision was the desirability of retaining workers during winter months, when their only occupation was maintenance and overhauling of machinery. A trial batch of starch which previously had to be imported, was well received at the 1884 Exhibition; production began in 1885, closely followed by cornflour.

In 1898 a new building was constructed at their premises, Queen Street, West Thebarton (between West Thebarton Road and the River Torrens) with completely new machinery, imported from Halle. This plant, comprising three independent machines of different capacities, could produce 40 tons of ice per day, and more efficiently, so the price could be reduced by a third.

In 1910 the old ice storage room, which was used as sleeping quarters for some of the workers, was destroyed by fire; some equipment was damaged but prompt action by the Hindmarsh voluntary fire brigade averted a catastrophe.

The company was in the happy situation of being the major supplier in a seller's market, and although highly seasonal, the company made a healthy profit for its shareholders in most years. Crystal's main competition was the Adelaide Ice and Cold Storage Works in Light Square, and in an attempt to control the price of ice, it was purchased in 1910 for £36,000 by the Verran (Labor) South Australian Government. The venture immediately proved troublesome, and after two independent enquiries, the Light Square factory was turned by the Peake government from a derided competitor to a contractor for the supply of ice to Crystal.

Crystal started making "Alaska" ice cream in 1915. It was by no means the first ice cream manufacturer in South Australia: S. Albert had a factory in Rundle Street in 1883; Edwin Ellis had a factory in Gouger Street, and was associated with Peters Ice Cream from 1914. Other early manufacturers were A. Williams with his "Snowdrop" factory in Rosa Street, Goodwood; Felice Maggi had the Imperial Ice Cream Factory in St. Vincent Street, Port Adelaide, then Excelsior Ice Cream factory on South Terrace, destroyed by fire, deliberately lit, in 1929; There was Wattle ice cream, made at the Mile End Cold Stores and P. Smyth had a factory in Murray Bridge, later known for "Freesia" ice cream. Rivals AMSCOL and Golden North did not appear until 1923 and 1953 respectively.

Alaska Ice Cream became a separate company in 1922, with offices at Queen Street, Thebarton, and acquired the rights to manufacture the confection known as "Eskimo Pie" in 1923. The company, along with the Interstate Fruit and Produce Company (which operated the East End Market) and the Broken Hill Ice and Produce Company, became part of Peters Alaska Ice Cream Company and changed its name accordingly in 1929.
Following a court case Peters American Delicacy Co. Ltd. v. Peters Alaska Ice Cream Co. Ltd., the company was renamed Alaska Ice Cream and Produce Company Limited in August 1932. A new office block was erected at Beans Road, Thebarton in 1953. Longtime managing director was Leonard Maurice Hocking (c. 1887 – 6 October 1948), and chairman of directors was T. E. Malone.

In 1930 Crystal combined with the Government Produce Depot and Amscol as the "Clear Ice Service" under chairman W. D. Price, and acted as a government-controlled monopoly supplier of an essential commodity, producing standard sized blocks of ice, and making available suitable icechests made in Unley by Chittleborough and Company, or could be produced by a do-it-yourselfer. Demand for ice fluctuated wildly, from practically zero to peaks like in March 1930 when reserves (around 3,000 tons) were exhausted, demand exceeded manufacture and supplies had to be rationed. Ice storage capacity reached a peak around 1944 then became redundant as domestic refrigerators became commonplace and home delivery of ice ceased around 1960.

Both companies are now defunct; the factory complex at Hindmarsh was taken over as part of University Research Park; one building has become "Alaska Towers".

== Some people ==
Vinrace Lawrance (16 January 1833 – 5 September 1922) was a prominent Adelaide accountant, member of the Stock Exchange and secretary of A.C.I.C. He was heavily involved in the mining industry and had a fine collection of minerals including prize samples of crystalline gold. He married Elizabeth Binney (c. 1839 – 19 July 1919) on 22 August 1861, lived at "Lopen", Mill Terrace, North Adelaide.

Wilhelm "William" Weber JP (c. 1837 – 17 December 1909) was born in Darmstadt and arrived in Australia in 1855. He founded an icemaking business in Bendigo in 1876 and another in Adelaide with J. M. Wendt, J. B. Neales, Jnr, T. Barnfield, W. K. Simms and J. Allison in 1878, then founded A.C.I.C. with those men and other investors. He never married, living at Southwark with his widowed sister Matilda Richards, and was three times mayor of Thebarton.

George Frank Richards (c. 1883 – 7 January 1924) was a son of Frank Richards (who may have been a driver for the company) and his wife Matilda, née Weber, (c. 1850 – 21 August 1913), sister of Wilhelm Weber. He was manager of A.C.I.C. from around 1910 and was largely responsible for diversification into ice cream and introduction of the "Eskimo Pie", both following trips to America. He had been both president and vice-president of Hindmarsh Bowls Club. He married Gertrude Ruby Reid (c. 1888 – 15 December 1933) on 26 September 1908; they lived at "Coonvrai", Beaufort street, Woodville.

Thomas Barnfield (c. 1848 – 19 August 1931) married Mary Ann Thomson (c. 1846 – 12 June 1927) on 4 April 1889; they lived at Wasleys, then Nottage Terrace, Medindie. He was chairman of the Crystal Ice Company board.

Hugh Logan was propounder and first manager of A.C.I.C. He arrived in Adelaide from America in February 1878 and signed the ten-year lease on the Ebenezer Chapel. A search of contemporary newspapers reveals nothing about his previous or later activities.

William B. Neales was secretary in 1878.

Walter Davies Price MC (24 March 1886 – 29 July 1944) was a son of Premier Tom Price and a brother of J. L. Price MHR. He joined the Lands Department of the SA Government in 1903 and in 1907 transferred to the Government Produce Department. He was appointed manager of the newly acquired Light Square iceworks in 1920 and general manager of the Department in 1941. He was first president of the SA division of the Australian Institute of Refrigeration, chairman of the Ice Manufacturers' Association and the Clear Ice Service. He was an officer with the 43rd Battalion, 1st AIF, was wounded near Armentières and was awarded an MC. He followed A. S. Blackburn VC as president of the RSL and of the 43rd Battalion Club.
