= North Kapunda Hotel =

Hotel in Kapunda, South Australia

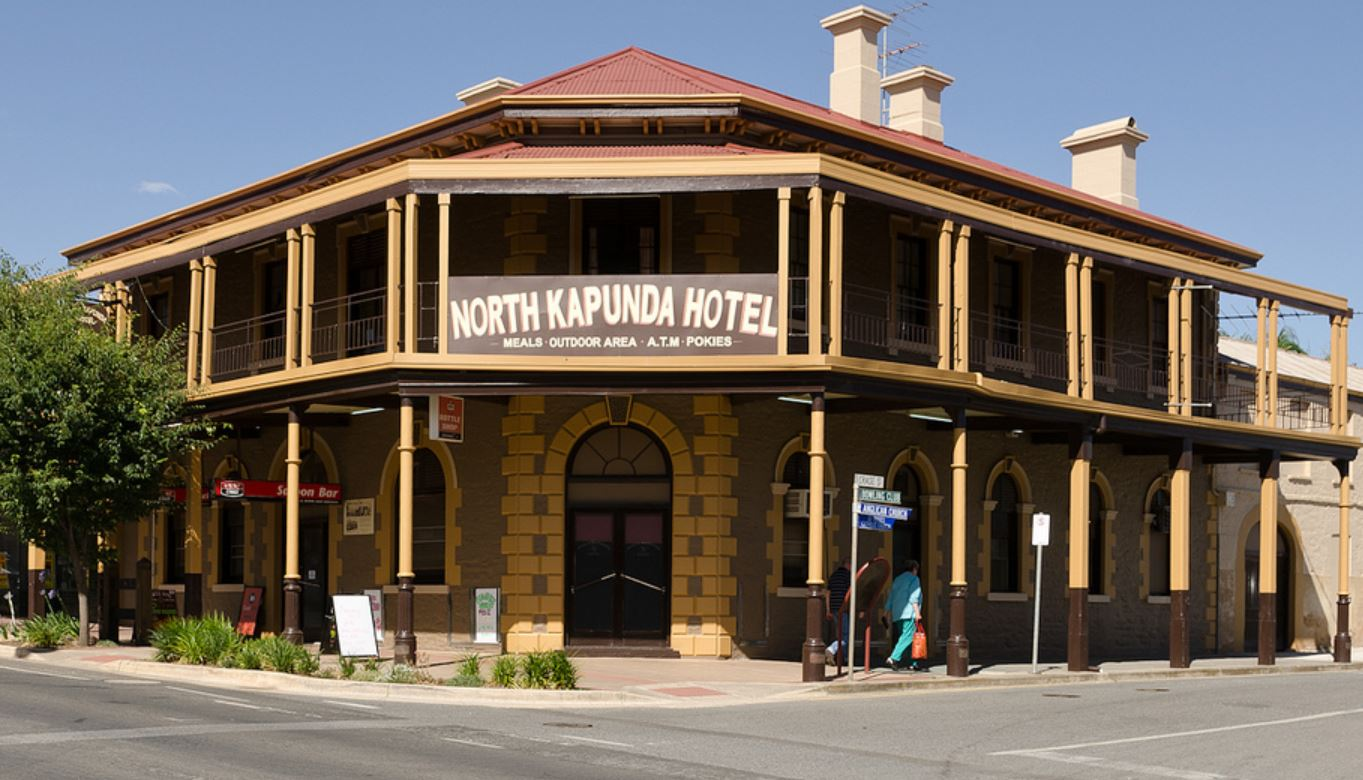
- Interactive map of North Kapunda Hotel
- Location: Kapunda, South Australia, Australia; 34.3407°S 138.9156°E
- Status: Open
- Opened: 1849 as the North Kapunda Arms

The North Kapunda Hotel is a pub located in Kapunda, South Australia.

== History ==
The hotel was opened in November 1849 as the North Kapunda Arms with John Bickford taking the lease, before being renamed Garland Ox in 1853. James Crase took the lease in 1853 and renamed it the North Kapunda Hotel three years later in 1856. Crase rebuilt the hotel in 1865 before selling it around 1875. The hotel was then named the Sir Sidney Kidman Hotel and eventually renamed to the North Kapunda Hotel in 2010.

By 1856, the Rose of the Forest of the South Australian Ancient Order of Foresters Friendly Society held their meetings at the hotel.

The pub was the site of the first reading of the Riot Act in South Australia from the hotel's balcony. It also serves as a venue for Fringe events.

The hotel is claimed by believers to be haunted and in 2014 was the focus of an episode of Australian TV series Haunting: Australia. The management promotes the site to tourists.

== See also ==
- List of oldest companies in Australia
