= Daniel Wilkie Melvin =

Australian auctioneer

Daniel Wilkie Melvin (1838 – 29 July 1916), commonly referred to as D. W. Melvin, was an auctioneer in the early days of Adelaide, South Australia.

== History ==
Melvin was a son of Rev. David Melvin (died before 1861), chaplain of Tolbooth Prison and Edinburgh City Mission. and Wilhelmina Melvin (c. 1800 – 8 July 1872). He was educated in Edinburgh, and emigrated to South Australia in 1852, two and a half years after his mother, brother and three sisters, who left Leith in June 1850 aboard the barque Young England.

He found employment with Goode brothers' drapery business, then joined his sister and brother-in-law James Whiting, in a similar business at Edinburgh House, 43 King William Street.

He moved to Oakbank, operating a store and wheat-buying business.

In April 1864 he left for Moonta, where he opened a similar store, also acting as postmaster and registrar of births, deaths, and marriages, and was active in the local literary society.

He returned to Adelaide in May 1867, when he began working as sub-editor of the South Australian Register, then was granted auctioneer's licence in June 1876 and began operating from Adelaide Central Auction Mart (also known as Adelaide Central Mart), opposite White's Rooms, King William Street, having taken over the business of Emanuel Cohen & Co. In 1883 he ceased operation at that location, and in November 1909 sold the lease to the firm of Megaw & Hogg (Note: The firm of Megaw and Hogg was founded at Broken Hill in 1901 by Joseph Porter Megaw (c. 1867 – 24 May 1922) and (John) Walker Hogg (died 1 February 1926). In 1909 they opened an Adelaide branch, with Megaw as manager, and Joseph Tracey Quigley was introduced as a partner in 1912. In 1921 the partnership was dissolved, and Hogg continued the business on his own account. The company persists into the 21st-century, owned by the Quigley family.) of Broken Hill.

He built Melvin Chambers on the site of the City Arms Hotel and Noltenius's store, corner of Waymouth and King William streets, in 1880.

== Other interests ==
By 1859 he was an active member of the Young Men's Association, a non-sectarian Christian literary society led by Rev. C. W. Evan. When he moved to Oakbank he made moves to establish a literary society in that town, but may have come to nothing. He was a member of the Oakbank Institute, which had similar aims and was vice-president in 1860.

He was a regular church-goer. Following the arrival of Rev. Silas Mead in July 1861, Flinders Street Baptist Church was founded on 5 August 1861, with two of his sisters, Mrs Whiting and Mrs Beeby, among the 25 foundation members, and Melvin joined in December the same year (the building was opened on 19 May 1863). He was closely involved with church activities and served as lay preacher to various congregations. When in Moonta he was prominent in establishing a Baptist Church.

He was a member of the councils of the Caledonian Society of South Australia and the Australasian National League.

He was a strong chess player, a member of the Adelaide Chess Club from 1873 (Note: From 1873 to 1884 he was referred to as "W. Melvin", so was perhaps known to friends and colleagues as "Wilkie".) to 1905, and was closely associated with Henry Charlick, coincidentally dying within a few days of each other.

He was a lover of books, and a great reader until prevented by failing eyesight, and died at his residence, Unley Park.

== Family ==
Melvin was three times married: Sarah Grace Lambell on 26 November 1861; Caroline Adams (1849–1896) in 1879; and Mary Ann Eliza in 1905.

He had five sons and two daughters.

- Richard Lambell Melvin (9 April 1865 – 1944), born in Moonta
- Henry Edward "Harry" Melvin (1868–1942)
- Charles Melvin (1870–1952)
- Herbert Melvin (1872–1946) of Mypolonga
- Wilhelmina Carswell Melvin (9 December 1880 – 29 June 1920) daughter of Caroline
- Malcolm "Mick" Melvin (1882– ), known as a cricketer, later of Dunedin, New Zealand
- Kate Muriel Melvin (1884–1942) never married

Melvin's siblings include:

- Isabella Melvin (12 November 1826 – 9 April 1915) married James Whiting shortly after arrival in South Australia. She was noted for her philanthropic and temperance work. She was one of the first members of the South Australian chapter of the Women's Christian Temperance Union, founded during Mrs Leavitt's visit in 1889. She held various positions on the executive, including President and Treasurer. She was also State Superintendent of the Mothers' Union, and was one of the original 25 members of the Flinders Street Baptist Church. She taught at Sunday School and served as deaconess of the church for nearly 50 years. They had nine children, including J. B. Whiting, secretary to South Australia's Agent General in London. She died at the Queen Mary Hospital, Westall Street, Hyde Park, and her remains were interred at the West Terrace Cemetery.
- Margaret Melvin (c. 1823 – 8 December 1906) married John Beeby in 1852.
- Jessie Melvin (c. 1821 – 21 August 1908) married George Duke in 1866. Duke was manager of the bookbinding department of the Government Printing Office. She was a foundation member of the Flinders Street Baptist Church, but later joined the Parkside Baptist Church, otherwise led a quiet life.
- William Melvin (c. 1836 – 8 October 1910) married Martha Ann Threadgold in 1864, then left for Western Australia, in 1908 living at Collie, Western Australia.
- Eldest brother David Melvin, (Note: Not the David Melvin of Ballarat and Melbourne, whose family came from Alloa, Scotland.) arrived in Australia independently of the other family members, and nothing was heard of him for over 50 years.
