= Peter McLean (cabinet maker) =

Scottish-Australian cabinetmaker

Peter McLean, a cabinet maker of Dumfries, Scotland, arrived in Port Phillip, Australia in February 1853 with his family during the gold rush. He crafted one of the finest and most remarkable examples of Victorian colonial cabinetmaking, no doubt with the post gold rush market in mind.

Described as a tour de force of precision joinery, wooden inlay and detailed, high-relief carving, McLean's pièce de résistance was a remarkable sideboard, or 'buffet', which has carved scenes depicting the early days of the then Colony of Victoria, including a native chief of the Yarra Yarra tribe and a tableau of Melbourne's founder John Batman with John Buckley. Whilst he would have been responsible for its overall design, it is probable that the carvings, which have a mix of British and Silesian styles were the work of Felix Terlecki (b1869), a craftsman from the Carlton district of Melbourne. Kinsman or relative, Angus McLean may also have been involved.

McLean was one of 3,360 exhibitors at the Intercolonial Exhibition of Australasia held in Melbourne in 1866–67, where he received a medal 'for excellent workmanship'. Described by a probable descendant, 'D. McL', as the work of a 'major part of half a lifetime', the sideboard was rebuilt and enlarged to include a new arched back inlaid with over 1,000 pieces of mahogany, cedar, blackwood and satinwood in time for the 42nd International Exhibition, held in London in 1873. Here, McLean received a bronze medal.

Peter Mclean was married to Jane, née Strong, and had at least three children, Joseph (c. 1841–1877), William (1845–1905) and Oliver (c. 1846–1890). The brothers worked together in the firm of McLean Bros & Rigg which specialized in wholesale and retail ironmongery, general hardware and machinery importing, and which is notable as having the first installation, in January 1878, of a regular commercial telephone service in Australia. It linked the head office in Elizabeth Street with their Spencer Street store — about 1.2 km away. In 1894 William resigned his public offices after admitting to deceptive banking practices and filed his insolvency schedule for £200,000, most of which was owed to the Federal and Real Estate Banks. He was permitted to retain his general managership in McLean Bros & Rigg and was finally released from sequestration in 1898. In 1900 he resigned from the firm which was bought by T. Luxton in 1907. He drowned at Brighton in 1905.
