= Ian Lawman =

British television personality and psychic

Ian Lawman is a British television personality and psychic. He has been featured on Help My House Is Haunted!, Haunting: Australia and Living With The Dead. Lawman is known for carrying out exorcisms on television shows.
