= Haunting: Australia =

- Genre: Paranormal; Reality TV
- Directed by: Katie Hides; Matt Bird
- Narrated by: David Ritchie
- Composers: Tim Peach; Momo: Tempo
- Country of origin: Australia
- Original language: English
- No. of seasons: 1
- No. of episodes: 8

Production
- Executive producer: Astrid Sampson
- Producers: Grant Osborn; Alenka Henry
- Cinematography: Damien Beebe; Mick Eady
- Editor: Ron Molnar
- Camera setup: Multiple
- Running time: 60 minutes (with commercials)
- Production company: Flame Productions

Original release
- Network: Syfy
- Release: 3 February – 24 March 2014

Haunting: Australia is an Australian paranormal television series that premiered on 3 February 2014 on Syfy. The series was commissioned by SF in July 2013, with production beginning in August 2013 and set to premiere on the network in 2014. However, following the closure of SF on 31 December 2013 and the launch of Syfy as its replacement, the series instead premiered on the newly launched Syfy channel on 3 February 2014.

== Premise ==
International paranormal investigator Robb Demarest selects his paranormal team of ghost hunters, psychics, mediums, and clairvoyants, to investigate Australia's most haunted locations.

Opening introduction: (narrated by Robb Demarest):

I've been investigating the paranormal for over 20 years. You name it, I've hunted it. And I believe this team has what it takes to find out what's haunting Down Under.

== Paranormal team ==
- Ian Lawman – From the UK, medium and ordained psychic exorcist.
- Ray Jorden – From the UK, paranormal investigator.
- Gaurav Tiwari – From India, ghost hunter and metaphysicist.
- Allen Tiller – From Australia, paranormal researcher, investigator award winning historian.
- Rayleen Kable – From Australia, Medium Clairvoyant.
- Robb Demarest – From the U.S., lead investigator.

== Episodes ==
No.	Title	Location	Original release date
1	"Woodford Academy"	Woodford, New South Wales	3 February 2014
The Haunted: Australia team investigate the Woodford Academy for Boys in the Blue Mountains, which is said to be haunted by the White Lady, believed to be a convict's wife who was hanged or possibly murdered by her husband in the back garden. It is also haunted by a mentally ill girl named Jessie, who was locked up in the attic by her father, the academy's founder. They are only two of the twelve ghosts that still reside here and are a part of what the workers call the "Dismal Dozen".
2	"Old Geelong Gaol"	Geelong, Victoria	10 February 2014
The team investigates Old Geelong Gaol, where even though four executions took place here, there were over 500 confirmed deaths caused by all the inmate attacks using their homemade shivs. The prison is also said to be home to the ghost of a violent former prisoner named Percy Ramage, a giant of a man in life, he appears in his cell as a seven-foot-tall shadow figure in death.
3	"Aradale Lunatic Asylum"	Ararat, Victoria	17 February 2014
The team travels to rural town of Ararat to investigate the Aradale Mental Hospital where it's reported over 10,000 patients died. With 70 buildings to explore, they tour its epicenter of paranormal activity; the highly-haunted Men's Wing, only accessed by a covered bridge called, "The Suicide Walk", was where the worst patients were kept and the spirit of Nurse Kerry resides, watching over the others.
4	"Gledswood Homestead"	Gledswood Hills, New South Wales	24 February 2014
The team investigates Gledswood Homestead, where the predominant Chisholm family once lived and died, including the tragic death of little Isabel Emmeline, who was quarantined here for scarlet fever and now roams the halls with her father John Chisholm, the builder of the main house. It's also said to be the home of a ghostly groundskeeper named John Biggs, who was instantly killed by a falling tree on the property in 1858.
5	"Adelaide Arcade"	Adelaide, South Australia	3 March 2014
The team heads to the southern part of the country to investigate the notoriously haunted Adelaide Arcade, where a local woman named Florence Horton was shot and killed by her jealous husband. They get up close and personal with Francis "The Beetle" Cluney, a former security guard who died when he fell into the mall's turbine engine. They also explore Regent Arcade, the mall next door and learn that a little boy named Sydney Kennedy Bryon was murdered when his psychic mother smothered him to death here in 1902.
6	"Australia Pioneer Village"	Wilberforce, New South Wales	10 March 2014
The team is in the Hawkesbury region to investigate the Australiana Pioneer Village, a colonial tourist attraction that opened in the 1960s. Using buildings from the 1800s that were transported from their original locations, it is believed that the former owners' spirits moved with them. From creepy cottages littered across Main Street and a schoolhouse named after Samuel Marsden whose malevolent energy is felt to a barbershop's top floor used as a brothel where ghostly ladies of the night are witnessed by tour groups, the entire village is highly haunted.
7	"North Kapunda Hotel"	Kapunda, South Australia	17 March 2014
The team are back in South Australia, this time in the Barossa region to investigate the North Kapunda Hotel, once used in the copper rush days as a brothel for all the Cornish miners that came to town. It also said to have the most haunted pub in the country. One of the members, Ray feels sick from the negative energy of the malevolent spirit simply called, "the man in black", who is believed to have killed a lady of the night in one of the rooms.
8	"Cockatoo Island"	Sydney Harbour, New South Wales	24 March 2014
The team tackles its biggest paranormal case yet when it investigates Cockatoo Island in Sydney Harbour. Described as the "Alcatraz of Australia", it was originally used as a convict penitentiary in the 1800s. The most haunted site on the premises is Biloela House, a former girls reformatory that is now allegedly home to the angry spirit of the "red lady", believed to be Mary Ann Lucas who, in life, was often seen arguing with her husband, the school's superintendent. The team also gets up close and personal with the ghost of George, a guard who was killed by prisoners while asleep on post.

== Broadcast ==
In the United States the series airs on Syfy, premiering 24 March 2015.

== See also ==
- Apparitional experience
- Parapsychology
- Ghost hunting
- Haunted locations in the United States
