= L. H. Berens =

Lewis Henry Berens (1855 – c. 5 December 1913), was a businessman, political theorist, lecturer and author in the colony of South Australia. He has frequently (and incorrectly) been referred to as Louis Behrens.

== History ==
Berens was born in Birmingham, England, one of several sons of Henry Berens (c. 1821 – 21 June 1882) and Julia Berens, of Birmingham, England, and educated at private schools in London, Germany and Brussels. In 1878 he began working for H. & A. Berens, jewellers, of which his father was a principal. In 1876 he left for Sydney, where for two years he acted as representative for the company, then left for Adelaide, where he entered business on his own account. Berens was a partner of Berens Brothers, jewellers and importers of Montefiore Chambers, on Waymouth Street, Adelaide and then Stephens Place from 1878 to 1892, and a member of the consortium that established Adelaide Arcade in 1885.

He was involved with Ignatius Singer (Note: Singer left for New Zealand around 1890, died at Petone, Wellington.) and Moritz Wolff Judell (c. 1846–1900) with producing the newspaper Our Commonwealth, 1886–1888. He was an active and enthusiastic single taxer and free trader, involved with the Land Nationalization Society. About 1886 Berens, Singer, Henty Taylor, Max Lewin, and some others began agitation in Adelaide for the taxation of land values as endorsed by Henry George, who in 1890 visited Adelaide. Singer and Behrens were instrumental in founding the Adelaide Democratic Club in 1887.

He was an unsuccessful candidate for the electoral district Sturt in the South Australian House of Assembly in 1890.

About 1891 Berens visited England accompanied by Singer, who settled in Yorkshire.

He was co-author with Singer, of the novel The Story of My Dictatorship (1893), as well as Towards The Light (1903), an argumentation concerning ethics.

Berens and his wife left Adelaide for London about 1893. He was honorary treasurer for the English League for the Taxation of Land Values from around 1902 to 1913.

== Other interests ==
He was a competitive chess player. After leaving for London he maintained correspondence with the Australian amateur historian Alfred T. Saunders.

== Publications ==
- Berens, Lewis Henry, The story of my dictatorship, Sterling Pub. Co Singer's co-authorship is mentioned once in ten citations. First edition, published anonymously by Bliss, Sands & Foster of London (1893) is now rare. A paperback facsimile has been produced by the University of California. The book is considered a standard tract by Henry George Societies. In 1911 a comedy based on the book was staged in Melbourne.
- Berens, Lewis Henry Toward the light; elementary studies in ethics and economics, London, S. Sonnenschein & co., 1903
- Berens, Lewis Henry, The Digger Movement in the Days of the Commonwealth - As Revealed in the Writings of Gerrard Winstanley, the Digger, Mystic and Rationalist, Communist and Social Reformer, London, Simpkin, Marshall, Hamilton, Kent, & Co. Ltd., 1906.

== Family ==
Berens married Rebecca Solomon, daughter of John Solomon JP (c. 1807 – 25 July 1889), on 4 September 1888. Their son Herbert Arthur Berens (17 May 1889 – ) was born in Adelaide and married Elsie Krause in London in 1921. John Solomon was a businessman of Alberto Terrace, Sydney.

Several Berens brothers, sons of Henry Berens (c. 1821 – 21 June 1882) and Julia Berens, of Birmingham, England, lived on Pulteney Street, Adelaide. The eldest, Bernard, died on 19 October 1880.
