= Saul Solomon (photographer) =

English-born Australian photographer (1836–1929)

Saul Solomon (15 January 1836 – 2 May 1929) was an English-born Australian photographer.

== Biography ==
Born in Knightsbridge, the son of Lawrence Solomon, (Note: Another biographer has him born in Knightsbridge, son of Joseph Solomon, and emigrating with his parents. Reference to the ship Gambia, while not necessarily untrue, is no longer available.) of Grosvenor Square He left for Australia on the Gambia, a vessel of 1000 tons (not Gambier) in June 1852. He prospected for gold in Bendigo, Victoria, ran a photographic business in Bourke Street, Melbourne, then Ballarat and finally Adelaide where he worked for many years with Townsend Duryea, finally founding the Adelaide School of Photography, owned by Duryea. He was one of the founders of the Adelaide branch of the Independent Order of Oddfellows. After the fire in Duryea's studio, the School building took over much of the functions of the King William Street premises. He was co-founder with Robert Carr Castle (1835 – 14 June 1896) in 1879 of the Academy of Music (despite its grandiloquent title, actually a place of light entertainment) on Rundle Street, which burnt down three times. He was a member, and for a time chairman, of the consortium that in 1885 built the Adelaide Arcade.

He was elected to the House of Assembly for East Torrens in 1887, beating The Hon. Thomas Playford. In 1890 he moved to Mount Gambier, where he ran one of the leading hotels.

The family moved to Northam, Western Australia, where he ran an extensive farm "Morby" and a bacon factory, and was a foundation member of the Northam Agricultural Society. He served as mayor for over 20 years, and was active in the Mechanics' Institute and School Board. He died in 1929; Patti died four years later; they had celebrated their diamond wedding in 1926.

== Family ==
Solomon married Martha "Patti" Kemp (20 May 1846 – 25 October 1933) in Carlton, Victoria on 13 October 1866

- Joseph Francis "Joe" Solomon (1870– ) moved to WA 1895, bankrupt 1912
- Emma Amelia Solomon (1873– )
- Laurence Alexander "Alex" Solomon (1875 – March 1924)
- Mabel Patti Solomon (1877 – 18 November 1924) married William P. Dempster, eldest son of Hon. C. E. Dempster
- Bertram Marcus "Bert" Solomon (1879 – ) married Elizabeth Walker in 1909.
- Herbert Abraham Solomon (1881 – 16 April 1901) died in South Africa during the Boer War, subject of a memorial window at St John's Anglican church, Northam.

There is no reason to believe Saul Solomon is related to the extensive family that includes Vaiben Louis Solomon.
