= J. M. Wendt =

Silversmith and manufacturing jeweler (1830–1917)

Joachim Matthias "J. M." Wendt (26 June 1830 – 7 September 1917) was a silversmith and manufacturing jeweller in the early days of South Australia.

== Life and career ==
Wendt was born in Itzehoe, a small town in Holstein, then a Danish province, son of Joachim Matthias Wendt and his wife Christina, née Schlichting. After his mother's death around 1839 he was brought up by his father and two sisters, then apprenticed to a watchmaker and silversmith. In 1848 Holstein was conquered by Prussia, and he found German rule so distasteful that he emigrated to South Australia, arriving in 1851, and was naturalised as a British citizen in 1864, facts which he used to deflect the popular ill-feeling against people of German origin during the Great War.

He began business as watchmaker and jeweller in the City of Adelaide at Pirie Street, and in 1852 opened premises at 68 Rundle Street, moving to larger premises at 84 Rundle Street in 1861 then no. 70 in 1874. Julius Ludwig Schomburgk (ca.1818 – 9 March 1893), a brother of Moritz Richard Schomburgk, was for many years Wendt's principal designer and workshop foreman. His business expanded steadily until it became one of the largest and best known in Australia. In 1869 he opened another shop at Mount Gambier and in 1888 another in Broken Hill, New South Wales, though this business was sold around 1895.

=== Later development ===
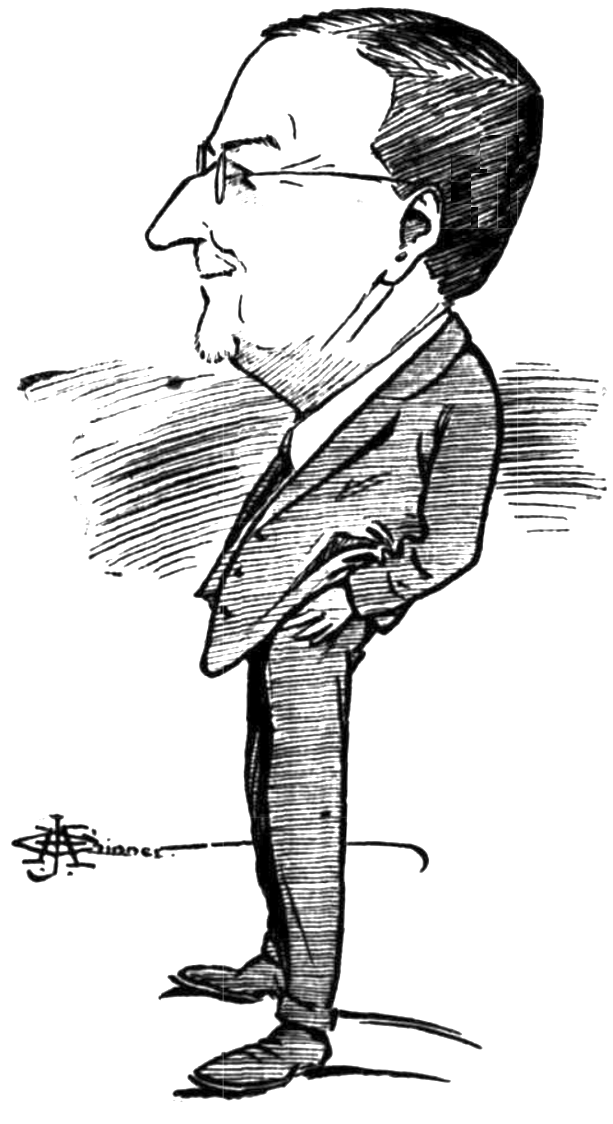
H. K. Wendt (J. H. Chinner)

In 1903 his son Julius M. "Jule" Wendt and stepson Hermann Koeppen-Wendt were brought in as partners in the firm and took over its management.

Business was transferred to a new shop at 74 Rundle Street in December 1904, with an optician's department and workshops on the first floor. Jule moved to London leaving Hermann in charge of the Adelaide business. When J. M. Wendt senior died in 1917, Hermann Koeppen-Wendt inherited the business. His sons A. and Kenneth were fighting overseas; Kenneth was killed in France and in 1927 Alan was brought into the company as an equal partner with his father, and in 1938 inherited the business, bringing his son Peter in as a partner in 1946. The company became Wendts Pty Ltd.in 1947 with Alan and Peter as directors.

=== Other activities ===
- He was part owner and director of the Adelaide Crystal Ice Company, the Metropolitan Brick Company and the Triumph Plow Company.
- He was one of the consortium that built the Adelaide Arcade, which he eventually owned, and opened a second shop at 24–28 in the Arcade.
- He was part owner of the original Theatre Royal in Hindley Street.
- He built the Freemasons' Hall in Flinders Street
- He was a member of the Tintinara Land Syndicate, which is credited with the discovery that the so-called 90-mile desert is not a barren waste, but by treatment with trace elements could become valuable arable land.
- He invested in gold mines in South Australia, notably the Bird-in-Hand and Mount Torrens.
- In later years he studied Count Mattei's system of homoeopathy, and treated many people.

== Recognition and notable work ==
- He won a first prize at the 1865 New Zealand Exhibition in Dunedin
- He produced 70 gold medals and 100 silver medals for the Adelaide Jubilee International Exhibition of 1867 held in conjunction with the visit to Adelaide of Prince Alfred. His company produced four presentation caskets for the Prince, who honoured him with a Royal Appointment as "Jeweller to His Royal Highness in the Colony of South Australia" The ceremonial trowels which he made for laying the foundation stones of the Albert Tower and Prince Alfred College were shown at that Exhibition.
- He produced the silver casket which was presented to the Duke of York (later George V) in 1901.
- Examples of his work are held by the National Gallery of Australia in Canberra, The Art Gallery of South Australia, Tamworth Regional Gallery Sydney's Powerhouse Museum
- A silver model of the surface works of the Block 10 mine at Broken Hill was presented in 1893 to its manager "Captain Jack" John Warren (1838–1910).
- A very large number of sporting trophies, such as the Hunt Club Cups, Waterloo Cups, Adelaide Cups.
- Silver tea and coffee service presented to G. W. Goyder.

== Family ==
Wendt married Johanna Maria Koeppen, née Ohlmeyer (1831–1919), a widow of an old friend, Hermann Theodore Koeppen or Köppen (c. 1825 – 1 November 1868), with four children, on 25 December 1869 at Zetland House on North Terrace, Rev. J. Crawford Woods officiating. Those children were:

- Hermann Carl (aka Carl Hermann) Koeppen-Wendt (24 July 1860 – 13 February 1938) married Jane Shannon (11 October 1864 – 5 December 1963) on 24 April 1889. Home "Hazelwood" in Winchester Street, St. Peters.

- Lois Muriel Koeppen-Wendt (17 January 1890 – )
- Alan Koeppen-Wendt (1 February 1892 – 1977) married Marie Florence Whitlock ( – ) on 27 October 1919 served during World War I, promoted to Captain 3rd Light Horse Regiment; Commanding Officer 6th Australian Cavalry Brigade during World War II. Marie Florence also served overseas as a staff nurse.
- Peter Koeppen-Wendt (22 May 1922 – ) married Mora Isabella Ryan (1923– ); they had two children.
- Kenneth Koeppen-Wendt (17 July 1898 – 6 May 1917) served with 10th Battalion in France during World War I; killed in action.

- Anna Wilhelmina Koeppen (8 March 1854 – 19 July 1933) married Thomas Drage Porter (c. 1850 – 9 April 1925) on 27 May 1873. Porter was Deputy Surveyor-General of South Australia 1911–1914.
- Louise Johanna Koeppen (7 April 1856 – 4 February 1894) married Herbert Hay James ( – 4 February 1931) on 6 October 1878.
- Clara Emilie Koeppen (15 April 1858 – 24 June 1940) married William Hall Henderson (28 July 1858 – 19 April 1912) on 5 March 1884. Henderson was manager and commercial secretary to Sir Edwin Smith.

Children of Jochim and Johanna included:

- Julius Matthias "Jule" Wendt (1871 – 2 March 1939)
- Alice Emily Louise Wendt (25 May 1873 – 1961) married Dr. Erich Haenel on 24 January 1901
- Margarethe Hermione Wendt (1875–) married Moritz E(rnst) Heuzenroeder (died 1948) on 5 August 1903. He was a nephew of organist Moritz Heuzenroeder (1849–1897).

He died at his home "Eskbank" in Wakefield Street east.
