= William Williams (brewer) =

Australian settler (1803–1858)

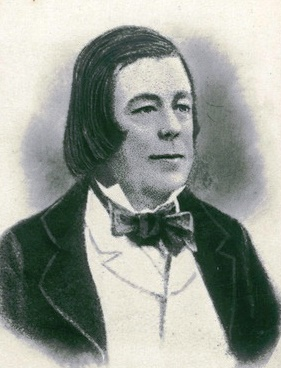
William Williams (c.1803–1858)

William Williams (c.1803 – 26 April 1858) was an early settler in the Province of South Australia, known for establishing the Walkerville Brewery and for his work on the Kaurna language. He was Deputy Colonial Storekeeper for some time.

== Early days in South Australia ==
Williams arrived in the new colony at Holdfast Bay on 8 November 1836 aboard Africaine, one of the ships of the "First Fleet of South Australia".

On 5 January 1837 Williams was appointed as a constable, along with Joseph Lee, at an annual salary of £30, with William Archer Deacon as chief constable. He was sent with a commission comprising George Stevenson (secretary to Governor Hindmarsh), Thomas Bewes Strangways and Henry Jickling, to investigate disturbances on Kangaroo Island which had occurred in September 1836. The three constables were sworn in on 7 March 1837. There were frequent drunken brawls owing to an abundant supply of rum on the island. However his appointment was terminated within about six months, in July of that year.

== Deputy Colonial Storekeeper ==
Williams was Deputy Colonial Storekeeper (an office involving responsibility for all government stores) to Thomas Gilbert, working at the "Government Iron Stores [on] Montefiore Hill". The location of the Store was at the place known by the Kaurna people as Tininyawardli (or Tinninyawodli), which was just south of where Strangways Terrace was later built, in North Adelaide. It is near Piltawodli, which name has been adopted for Park 1 of the Adelaide parklands.

== Involvement with Kaurna people and language ==
Williams, along with James Cronk, who also arrived on Africaine, made a deliberate effort to find and communicate with the local Aboriginal people, the Kaurna, or "Adelaide tribe". He was observed to make friends with a group of local people near Glenelg within a couple of weeks of arrival, and Cronk made an effort to learn the Kaurna language early. Both men were reportedly "great favorites of the natives", and became designated interpreters by the colonial officials. On 1 November 1838 they both assisted the Protector of Aborigines, William Wyatt, when Governor Gawler first met the local people, including Onkaparinga Jack and Captain Jack (a.k.a. Murlawirrapurka and Kadlitpinna, both native constables).

His work entitled A vocabulary of the language of the Aborigines of the Adelaide district, and other friendly tribes, of the Province of South Australia was self-published in 1839, to be sold in London as well as Adelaide. In the preface, he writes respectfully and affectionately of the Kaurna people. Williams also created a list of 377 Kaurna words, published in the Southern Australian on 15 May 1839 and republished in The South Australian Colonist on 14 July 1840. This list included eight Kaurna place-names from around the city, and three from the northern area, including Patawalonga and Willunga.

In April 1839, Williams accompanied police and Aboriginal trackers, including Kadlitpinna, as interpreter on an expedition to the Lyndoch Valley area to the north of Adelaide, to bring murderers of a shepherd called Duffield to justice. Williams' account of the expedition was published in the South Australian Gazette and Colonial Register in May.

== Career as merchant and brewer ==
=== Hindley Street hotels ===
Williams was the second person in the Province of South Australia to hold a liquor licence, applying for two licences on 16 June 1837 (one for wine, beer and other malt liquors, and the other for spirits), and probably the third brewer (the first two being Anthony Lillyman and then John Warren). He first purchased the eastern moiety of Town Acre 74, in Hindley Street in May 1838, opening a pub called the Grazier's Hotel. He then started trading in cattle, and also did business in timber and land, and then engaged his brother-in-law Edward Catchlove built a grander establishment named the Victoria Hotel.

This was replaced a year later by an even more upmarket establishment of the same name built over the road on a portion of Town Acre 51 (on the northern side, now no. 94 Hindley Street) and opened in March 1840. The earlier building was sold to the South Australian Club, a private gentlemen's club for the elite, for £2200, and was later the Club House Hotel.

In December 1939 Williams announced in the South Australian Record that the opening of the new hotel was imminent, "for the accommodation of families and gentlemen arriving in the colony, and where every possible attention will be paid to the comfort of those who may honour him with their patronage. The hotel will consist of one large public diningroom, three smaller ones private, several double and single bed-rooms, subscription billiard-room, most comfortable, airy, and extensive livery stables, stockyard, etc. N.B. The stable is now open for the reception of horses. There is a plentiful supply of hay and corn, and a most experienced groom, who is well known to most of the colonists".

The Victoria Hotel was later owned and run by "Mrs. G. Taylor", niece of Jane Williams (née Catchlove), for at least 30 years after taking it over in 1876.

=== Walkerville Brewery ===
After leasing out the new Victoria, Williams traded in real estate on the Adelaide plains, building enough capital to build the Walkerville Brewery in 1847. The brewery was co-founded with William Colyer, but the partnership was dissolved late the same year, and Colyer returned to England. Williams commissioned architect Thomas Price in 1846 to erect buildings in Fuller Street, including malthouse, store and other buildings. Williams was found insolvent 1851, but only had his certificate annulled in 1853.

=== Church ===
Williams gained notoriety in 1851 for his obstruction to the formation of the Walkerville Anglican Church committee, although according to the church website, Williams gave the land on which the church was built in 1848.

== Family ==
Williams married Jane Catchlove (c.1811 – 20 April 1885) on 2 July 1837. Jane arrived in South Australia in November 1836 aboard Tam O'Shanter with her father Edward William Catchlove and three brothers and sisters. Henry Catchlove of Hindmarsh Brewery was an uncle.

William and Jane had eight children, including:

- William Huey Williams, who was educated at Adelaide Educational Institution and St Peter's College, Adelaide, was admitted to the Royal College of Surgeons of England in June 1873, passed his exams in anatomy in 1875, and, after studying there, became Resident House Physician at the Royal Infirmary Liverpool; and
- Mary Laura Williams (1845 – 13 November 1880), their third daughter who married Thomas Moseley, son of Henry Moseley of Glenelg, on 25 October 1877.

The newspaper announcement of Mary's marriage says that she was "niece to the late Colonel Richardson Williams Huey".

== Death ==
Williams died on 26 April 1858 in Sturt Street, destitute. A subscription organised to benefit his widow and seven remaining children was well patronised.
