= Henry Hussey (pastor) =

Pastor in South Australia (1825–1903)

Henry Hussey (27 August 1825 – 6 May 1903) was a pastor in the colonial days of South Australia, closely associated with the Christian Church on Bentham Street along with pastors Abbott, Finlayson and Playford. He was the author of several influential books on religious themes, and a memoir.

== History ==
Hussey was born in Wimborne, Dorsetshire or Kennington, London, the second son of George Edward Hussey of Poole, Dorset, who claimed Norman descent, and Catherine Hussey, née Burt. Hussey was educated at a dame school in a house once occupied by the poet William Cowper, and was first employed as office boy for a firm of brewers.

In March 1839 George and Catherine Hussey and four of their children left for South Australia aboard Asia, arriving at Holdfast Bay on 16 July. The two eldest children, George Edward and Mary Ann, if surviving, do not appear on the ship's passenger list. The family, with hundreds of others, camped at "Emigration Square" on the parklands west of Hindley Street, Adelaide, later found accommodation on Hindley and Rundle streets.

=== Business ===
Hussey found work selling bread door-to-door, as an office boy, on coastal shipping and other endeavours. In 1840 he moved with his father to Port Adelaide, and in August 1841 found employment as a compositor with the printer George Dehane, working on his short-lived newspaper The Adelaide Independent and Cabinet of Amusement. He tried country life for a while, but returned to Dehane's printery, where he was involved in production of the first number of John Stephens' The Adelaide Observer (1 July 1843).

His father ran a "bazaar" selling small luxuries, coupled with a land agency, on Hindley Street, at that time Adelaide's premier shopping strip, sharing the premises with his wife Catherine, who started a millinery business. He had plans to move his place of business to the newly developing Port Adelaide, but died in September of the following year. Mrs Hussey's business flourished, and she built new premises on King William Street, between Rundle and Grenfell, in August 1844.

By 1844 Hussey was an ardent church-goer, attending the (Anglican) Trinity Church, adjacent to Dehane's printery. He left Dehane and joined the staff of the General Post Office, delivering letters to the east side of the city, but after a few months returned again to the print shop. In 1850 he was able to branch out on his own, and in January 1851 printed the first issue of The Church Intelligencer and Christian Gleaner, a subscription monthly edited by Archdeacon Hale and the Revs. W. J. Woodcock and W. H. Coombs. This publication ceased in April 1852, at a time of recession brought about by the rush to the goldfields of Victoria. Hussey took over printing and publication of The Register, up to that time handled by William Kyffin Thomas, commencing with the issue of 11 February 1852. Kyffin Thomas returned to the newspaper early in the new year (he had been at the goldfields). Hussey returned to job printing in July 1853 from premises on King William Street, opposite the Southern Cross Hotel. In 1854 he took on J. T. Shawyer as partner David Gall was admitted to the partnership in July 1855, trading as Hussey, Shawyer and Gall on King William Street, "near Green's Exchange", which may have been the same premises at 47 King William Street later described as "adjacent Green's Auction Mart", "at the end of a long passage". Shawyer left in 1856 to open his own printery on Gawler Place, and Hussey and Gall continued to March 1857.

In December 1853 his mother sold her premises on King William Street to F. H. Faulding for £1,000 and reopened on O'Connell Street, North Adelaide. She apportioned her windfall gains to her children; Henry used his share to purchase further blocks of land: one on Victoria Square, one on Wellington Square, one at Goolwa, and one at Port Elliot.

From January to December 1854 Hussey (or Hussey & Shawyer) published The South Australian Sunday School Magazine

In July 1858 he published the first number of the monthly quarto The Christian Advocate and Southern Observer. At some stage Gall took over publication and the quarter beginning July 1859 may have been its last.

Rather than retire from business altogether, Hussey accepted a position in the Government Printing Office. In 1866 George Fife Angas, a wealthy pastoralist and member of Hussey's church, offered him a position as his private secretary, succeeding William Ramage Lawson, who had embarked on a career in journalism. Among his duties was the selection and collection of personal papers for a biography of the great man. He also assisted him in founding the Bushman's Home, opened on the south-east corner of Whitmore Square, a building previously the city residence of Judge Cooper, in May 1870/

=== Religion ===
Although already a regular churchgoer, Hussey's interest in religion quickened around the time he started at Dehane's printery on Morphett Street and became involved with the nearby Trinity Church. From 1844, at age 18, to 1851 he conducted Bible classes for children of the church. He was at Holy Trinity during the incumbency of Colonial Chaplain C. B. Howard and James Farrell, a pre-millenarian, who may have ignited his preoccupation with the Second Coming and Scriptural prophesies. He moved to North Adelaide, and started a Sunday School at Christ Church on 23 December 1849. In March 1853 he was licensed as a lay reader by Bishop Short.

He was invited to a preliminary meeting held 8 February 1853 to start a local chapter of the Young Men's Christian Association (now YMCA) by Charles Henry Goode. (Goode was one of its first members in London, and a close acquaintance of founder George Williams.) The formation meeting, held four months later, was addressed by W. Roby Fletcher.

In April 1854 Hussey left the printing business in the hands of his partner, John Thomas Shawyer (1825–1895), and left on a trip to the United States, visiting Tahiti and Panama on the way. He had previously had misgivings about the baptism of children, and while in the United States he came under the influence of the "Disciples of Christ", whose tenets included adult baptism by total immersion. He was baptised by its founder Alexander Campbell (1788–1866) at Bethany, Virginia on 6 August 1854. He continued to England, where he prepared his book The Australian Colonies for publication.

On his return to South Australia after more than a year's absence, he lectured at the Bible Christian Church, whose views on baptism were similar to his own, at their chapel in Franklin Street (later known as Maughan Church). He attracted some followers in the districts south of Adelaide such as McLaren Vale, and baptised them in local rivers.

He frequently preached at the "Christian Church" (closely allied with the "Disciples of Christ" or "Christian Disciples Church"), which had a chapel in Bentham Street, founded October 1848, whose pastor was Thomas Playford. They built another church in Grote Street around 1857, greatly enlarged in 1873. A dispute arose in the church, and Hussey and others broke away, and for a time met in J. L. Young's schoolroom on Gawler Place. The nature of the controversy is not known, but a common source of disagreement was the use of certain musical instruments in church: some arguing that only activities mentioned in Scripture were allowed, others that what is not forbidden may be permissible.

He was one of many Protestant leaders who decried the failure of the Marriage Bill before the House in December 1866, its failure being applauded by the Catholic hierarchy. He was secretary to the committee formed for drafting the second Marriage Bill, which passed both houses in December 1867.

Hussey was involved in the elections of 1871, when he helped return John Pickering to the seat of West Torrens. He once declared himself a candidate for public office (Encounter Bay in 1875) but dropped out after faring poorly at a public debate. It has been asserted that he withdrew following criticism from some fellow-religionists.

Hussey was a regular contributor to The Protestant Advocate, an anti-Catholic weekly which ran from 1870 to 1879, edited by John Griffiths and published by the proprietor James Heath Lewis (c. 1816 – 6 December 1890) In 1871 Griffiths resigned his position on principle, but later returned to the paper. In 1872 the Protestant Advocate published a series of libels on the Sisters of St Joseph, for which Lewis was jailed for six months. Hussey acted as editor for six months, and it could have been during either of those disruptions. Then in March 1877 the paper published a report that the wife of Rev. Samuel Green had turned Catholic, a falsehood that again landed the publisher in court. Lewis blamed Griffiths. Green (died 1904) was an Anglican minister with high church leanings. His wife, the former Ellen Elizabeth Bayfield, was a daughter of (Anglican) Rev. Edward Bayfield (c. 1815–1857). Both men having had charge of St Paul's Church, Port Adelaide.

In January 1867, with the health of pastor Thomas Playford failing, Hussey accepted the position of his assistant at the Bentham Street Church. In 1873, following the death of Playford, Hussey took over the pulpit, which he managed without financial reward until 27 January 1891, when he retired, although he did make a brief comeback in 1893 following some dissension in the congregation.

He started a monthly Gospel of the Kingdom in July 1878, which became the Australian Quarterly Journal of Prophecy in July 1879 last issue January 1895. This publication had no connection to Horatius Bonar's Journal of Prophecy.

In 1884 he founded the "Adelaide Bible Hall", a commercial outlet for Bibles, hymn books, etc., at the corner of Flinders and Freeman streets, still operating in 1891.

== Other interests ==
- He was a member of the committee of the Aborigines' Friends' Association 1876–1879 and its chairman in 1877
- He was a member of the Adelaide Benevolent and Strangers' Friend Society. 1872–1879.
- In 1877 Hussey erected a two-storey building on his Victoria square property.

== Final illness and death ==
Hussey had been confined to bed at his residence in Hackney. On Tuesday afternoon 5 May 1903 he had a seizure leading to total paralysis and died at midnight.

== Bibliography ==
- The Australian Colonies : together with notes of a voyage from Australia to Panama (London: Blackburn & Burt; Adelaide: E.S. Wigg, 1855)
- History of South Australia (unpublished ms.) The only entry to the Gawler Institute's 1860 competition, which the judges allowed to be withdrawn for completion and publication at his own risk, when it would be awarded the £200 prize, but see note on The History of South Australia from its Foundation to the Year of its Jubilee below.
- Nebuchadnezzar's Image : being the substance of a lecture on prophecy, delivered in Melbourne, Sydney, Adelaide, &c. (H. Hussey, Adelaide, 1878)
- More than Half a Century of Colonial Life and Christian Experience : with notes of travel, lectures, publications, etc. (Hussey & Gillingham, Adelaide, 1897) also facsimile edition 1978 with photographs by Ernest Gall
- The Scripture History of the Christ and of the Antichrist : a Scripture study (Hussey & Gillingham, Adelaide, 1900)

Edwin Hodder (1837–1904) wrote George Fife Angas: Father and founder of South Australia about the famous colonist (1789–1879) who, inter alia was the instrument of German settlement in South Australia, published in England in 1891 (not 1893) by Hodder & Stoughton. Authorised by the Angas family, it used information from Hussey's diary as well as Angas's papers, selected and passed to Hodder by Hussey. None of the newspaper reviews, the most extensive being that in the Register, mentioned Hussey's contribution.

Hodder, whose family relationship to London publishers Jackson, Walford & Hodder, and Hodder & Stoughton is not clear, was a prolific author of historical, biographical and (Protestant) religious works, also wrote the two-volume The History of South Australia from its Foundation to the Year of its Jubilee. With a Chronological Summary of all the Principal Events of Interest up to date. (1893, two volumes) This work has been described as having Hussey's entry to the Gawler Institute's 1860 "History of South Australia" competition as its nucleus.

== Family ==
George Edward Hussey (7 November 1792 – 8 September 1842), born in Wimborne Minster, Dorset, married Catherine Burt (c. 1793 – 8 June 1874) on 14 February 1821 in London. "left wife and four children"; Catherine Frances was "only daughter" so no Mary Ann

- George Edward Hussey
- Mary Ann Hussey

The four children who came out to Australia aboard Asia in 1839 were:

- Henry Hussey (27 August 1825 – 6 May 1903) married Mary Ann Reid (died 25 June 1860) on 19 December 1857. She was a sister of Rev. Richardson Reid, incumbent of Trinity Church

- Henry Burt Hussey (1860 – 29 March 1882)
Henry Hussey married again, to Agnes Neill (4 February 1829 – 5 August 1920) on 11 November 1861. She arrived aboard Recovery in 1839 (Also on board were James Harris (c. 1799 – 16 May 1874) and his wife Dinah Harris, née Hussey (c. 1801 – 23 November 1876). No family connection has yet been found.) They had three more children:
- Catherine Jane Hussey (18 September 1863 – ) married James Henry Cheetham (c. 1854 – 16 March 1936) on 15 May 1888. They lived at Blackwood. He married again, to Nellie ( – 26 March 1934), lived in Brighton
- Agnes Mary Hussey (11 September 1866 – 1937)
- son ( –1888?)

- George Frederick Hussey (c. 1828 – 26 November 1872) married Emma Maria Tidmarsh (18 March 1829 – 30 March 1922) in 1851

- George Frederick Hussey MHA (20 August 1852 – 13 June 1935) married Kate Young Cooke on 20 August 1877. He was also in a printing firm, trading as Hussey & Gillingham founded 1889. Hussey retired from the business 1922.

- Catherine Frances Hussey (c. 1830 – 15 November 1867) married Charles Abraham Basham on 15 May 1854. She died after delivering twin daughters; eight children in all.
- Charles Henry Hussey MHA (27 September 1832 – 8 January 1899) married Harriet Ada Webb (c. 1836 – 16 May 1914) on 6 March 1856
