= South Australian Gazette And Colonial Register =

The South Australian Gazette And Colonial Register was the name of two different publications in early South Australia. Both later changed their name.

- South Australian Gazette And Colonial Register (1836–1839) later became the South Australian Register
- South Australian Gazette And Colonial Register (1845–1847) became the South Australian Gazette and Mining Journal
