= Samuel E. Roberts =

Australian printer and publisher

Samuel Edward Roberts (5 November 1824 – 23 September 1905) was a printer and publisher in Adelaide.

== History ==
Roberts was born in the Old Fleet Market (now Farringdon Street) London, a son of Samuel Edward Roberts (c. 1790 – 20 December 1869). He was educated at the Grammar School at Tonbridge, Kent, and the City of London School, then served a seven-year apprenticeship in London as a compositor.

He emigrated to South Australia aboard Symmetry, arriving in Adelaide in November 1848 after a long voyage of 147 days. His intention was to take up sheepfarming, but circumstances dictated otherwise, and he found employment as a printer.

In February 1852 he joined the rush to the Victorian goldfields, where he was moderately successful and returned to Adelaide late that same year.

He returned to his trade, working as a journeyman printer until June 1855, when he went into business on his own account on Currie Street, roughly opposite Leigh Street, later moved to Gawler Place; it was at this time he published The South Australian Horticulturist and Magazine of Agriculture, Botany and Natural History, edited by J. F. Wood FHS.

He sold up to J. T. Shawyer in March 1856, and took up farming on the River Light, near Kapunda, supplementing his income by carting copper ore with a bullock team from Burra to Gawler until 1862, when the Copper Company began employing their own teams. Roberts entered the Government service in 1863, and remained there till 1865, when he took over George Dehane's stationery business at King William Street, opposite White's Rooms.

From January 1867 he accepted the job of printing the weekly Pasquin; from June he acted also as business manager for its founder and editor E. R. Mitford. The paper was only two years old when Mitford died, and did not long outlast him; its last issue was published on New Year's Eve 1870.

In mid-1872 he moved his business to 64 Hindley Street. Later that year he was proven insolvent and the whole of his printing plant was liquidated by auction. In the Northern Territory boom year 1873 to 1874 he worked as a sharebroker, before briefly returning to the Government Printing Office.

He was appointed local director of the Palmerston Goldmining Company, but on arriving in Darwin found the company was in liquidation, and after tying up some loose ends returned to Adelaide. He worked briefly in the offices of The Register and The Advertiser, then in 1880 again entered the Government Printing Office, where he remained until he retired late in 1904.

He died three days after passing into a coma from which he never regained consciousness.

== Family ==
Samuel Edward Roberts married Ruth Wylde (c. 1833 – 4 May 1901) on 18 December 1850. Their family included:

- Charles Edward Roberts (24 September 1851 – 23 November 1932) Ellen "Nelly" Cleary in August 1892 at Charters Towers
- Amy Roberts (5 September 1853 – ) never married
- Percy Arthur Roberts (21 July 1857 – ) married Elizabeth Anne Ninnes Woolcock in 1895 worked for Yalumba
- Leonard Roberts (1 September 1859 – )
- Annie Eliza Roberts (6 October 1861 – ) married William Irven Dawkins on 30 June 1883
- Catherine Maud Roberts (3 June 1864 – ) married (William) Henry Brownett in 1884
- Alice Angelica Roberts (9 June 1866 – ) married Thomas James Dinneny in 1885
- Frederick Walter Roberts (24 July 1868 – 20 November 1942) married Ada Mary Lane in 1883, moved to Fremantle
- Jessie Edith Roberts (19 April 1871 – ) married Alfred Dawkins on 3 June 1891
- Clara Blanche Roberts (23 June 1874 – ) never married
- George Adolphus Roberts (15 September 1876 – ) married Adelphine Vassey on 20 December 1905, moved to Mildura

They had a home in Devon street, Goodwood.
