= The Adelaide Independent and Cabinet of Amusement =

19th-century Australian newspaper

The Adelaide Independent and Cabinet of Amusement was a weekly newspaper published in Adelaide, South Australia from 5 August 1841 to 18 November 1841.

The paper, of four or five pages, was printed and published by George Dehane from premises on Morphett Street, adjacent Trinity Church.

Its editor was Nathaniel Hailes (1802 – 23 July 1879), who had earlier published Adelaide Free Press (7 October 1841 – 18 November 1841 may have been the sum total of its existence), and wrote Personal Recollections of a Septuagenarian, published as weekly instalments in the South Australian Register in 1877–1878, and other articles under the pseudonym "Timothy Short". Adelaide Free Press was praised by the Sydney Gazette (while mistakenly calling it the Adelaide Independent), although the Gazette anticipated its early demise in an overcrowded market.

Henry Hussey (1825–1903) worked as compositor for Dehane. He would be better known as pastor of the Bentham Street Christian Church (with which Rev. Thomas Playford is closely identified), and author of Colonial Life and Christian Experience (1897).

Dehane next published the Adelaide Examiner, but dissociated himself from the issue of 21 July 1842. He was also publisher of the Port Lincoln Herald.

== Digitization ==
The National Library of Australia has digitized photographic copies from 5 August 1841 to 18 November 1841 as part of the Australian Newspapers Digitisation Project.
