= McEwin =

Surname list

McEwin is the surname of the following people

- George McEwin (1815–1885), Australian gardener and orchardist
- George McEwin (lawyer) (1873–1945), Australian lawyer and philanthropist
- Jim McEwin (1898–1979), New Zealand cricketer
- Lyell McEwin (1897–1988), Australian politician
- Ron McEwin (1928–2007), Australian rules footballer

== See also ==
- Lyell McEwin Hospital, major hospital for Adelaide, South Australia
