= George Dehane =

Australian printer & publisher (1808-1864)

George Dehane (1808 – 23 December 1864) was a printer and publisher in the early days of Adelaide, South Australia.

== History ==
Dehane was a son of Rev. J. Dehane, curate of Beckbury, Shropshire.

He was a workman in the printing office of the South Australian Register.

By 1838 he had his own printing and stationery business in Stephens Street (between Halifax and Gilles streets), and was agent for Robert Thomas & Co. and the South Australian Gazette. In 1839 he was editing and printing the Port Lincoln Herald, at first in Adelaide, and later that year established a printery at Port Lincoln. commencing on 16 November 1839.

By 1841 he had established a printery at Morphett Street, where he printed The Adelaide Independent and Cabinet of Amusement, a weekly newspaper that ran from 5 August 1841 to 18 November 1841. It was followed by The Examiner, of which he was sole proprietor, and printed from its first issue of 25 November 1841 to 24 June 1843.

Richard Penney was editor from 12 August 1842, then resigned in June 1843 over the insertion in the paper of an article "Nonmus the Bolter".

The Adelaide Observer took its place. Published by John Stephens, it was printed by Dehane from July 1943 to around June 1845, when Stephens opened his own press. Its banner changed to The Observer on 7 January 1905.

In April 1845 the business ("Dehane's General Printing Office") moved to new premises on King William Street, adjacent Montefiore & Co. (Note: Montefiore & Co. occupied the block on the Grenfell Street corner, later the site of the Imperial Hotel.) The Adelaide Times was printed there by James Allen from 1849 to early 1850, when Allen purchased the business, renamed it "The Adelaide Times General Printing Office".

Samuel E. Roberts (1824–1905) took over the business in 1865, and notably printed Pasquin for E. R. Mitford before quitting the business.

=== Dehane's Almanac ===
In 1841 Dehane was accused of printing a pirated copy of Robert Thomas & Co.'s sheet almanac. He went on to publish sheet almanacs for each year and later started publishing a book almanac. In later years these publications attracted interest for their historical content.

=== Imperial Adelaide Primer ===
In October 1842, an unsolicited critique of a book entitled Dehane's Imperial Adelaide Primer was published in the Examiner as a "Letter to the Editor". It adumbrates on the way in which the primer diverges systematically from those of Mavor and Markham. It praises the illustrations by (William ?) Huggins and (George?) Morland, engraved by (presumably Thomas) Bewick. The oddity is that no advertisement or reference to any book of that or similar name has been found, and the "critique" can only have been a kite-flying exercise or convoluted political satire, and the "critic", identified as "P.L.", most likely Dehane himself.

== Family ==
Dehane was married. His widow died in Wolverhampton, England, in February 1890. She was highly regarded as a businesswoman and philanthropist, being a founder of the Female Refuge. One daughter survived to adulthood: Jessie Agnes Dehane married Charles Matthews of Wolverhampton on 6 October 1863. Dehane had a brother, Dr Dehane of Wolverhampton, of some local notability.

Dehane died after a long illness. His remains were interred at the West Terrace Cemetery; the graveside service was conducted by Rev. John Crawford Woods.

Their home in Glenelg, the property of Francis Clark and Sons, became the residence of John Colton.
