= The South Australian Colonist =

Australian newspaper

The South Australian Colonist, full name The South Australian Colonist and Settlers' Weekly Record of British, Foreign and Colonial Intelligence, was a weekly newspaper published in London between March and September 1840.

The journal was established by George Fife Angas with the aim of encouraging people to immigrate to South Australia. It was published every Tuesday afternoon, cost sixpence and was distributed in London, in the new Province of South Australia, other Australian settlements, as well as in British India and Europe. The proceedings of the Aborigines' Protection Society were published within the journal, and it contained English and foreign news as well as carrying advertising. It sought to represent the views and experiences of the new colonists, as well as extolling the virtues of the governance of the new colony, which included the "civilisation of the natives". It published letters by prominent colonists, including Charles Sturt, Pastor August Kavel, the Lutheran missionary Clamor Schurmann, and Charles Flaxman. Much was written about the local Aboriginal people, the Kaurna, describing their customs and work done among them, including that of Schurmann and Deputy Colonial Storekeeper, publican and brewer William Williams.

The editor of the newspaper was John Stephens, who had earlier been editor of the London newspaper, Christian Advocate, prominent in the anti-slavery movement. Upon arrival in South Australia in 1843, founded the Adelaide Observer, and later bought and edited the South Australian Register.

The South Australian Colonist was published from Volume 1, No. 1 (Tuesday, 10 March 1840) to Volume 1, No. 29 (Tuesday, 22 September 1840). Originally published by William Cecil Huttmann, the whole run has been digitised as PDF files under the Australian Cooperative Digitisation Project.

A notable article, subsequently used by linguists as a basis for study of the Kaurna language, was the wordlist created by Deputy Storekeeper and later brewer, William Williams, containing 377 words, including some local place names. This was published on 14 July 1840, after having been published in the Southern Australian in the previous year.

After its demise, the journal was succeeded by the less costly and longer-running South Australian News in 1841.
