= Edward Stephens (Australian settler) =

Australian banker

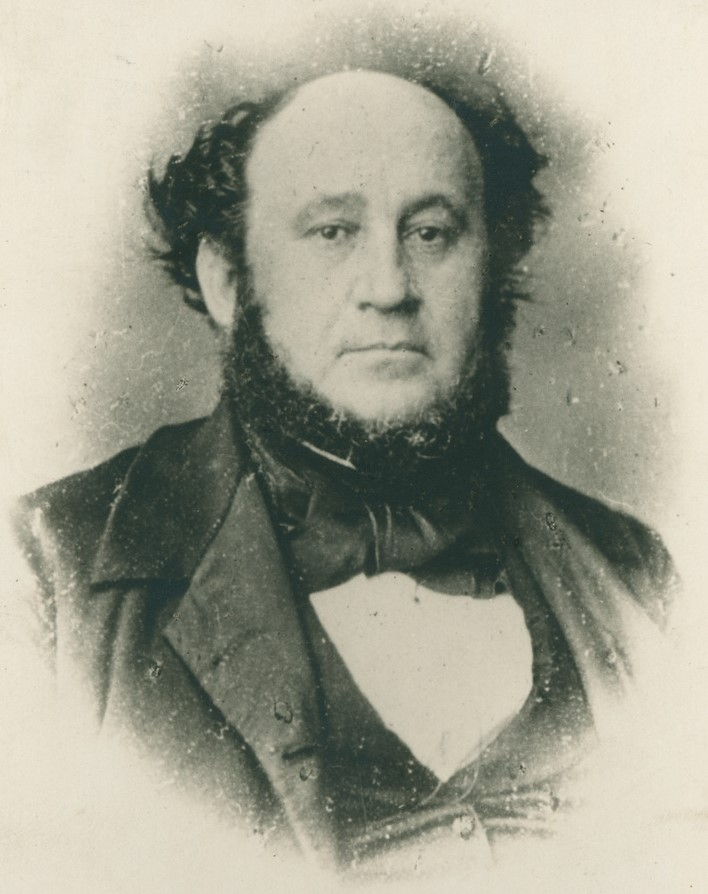
- Born: 19 October 1811; London, England
- Died: 12 March 1861 (aged 49)
- Occupation: Banker
- Spouse: Emma Baron
- Relatives: John Stephens (brother); Samuel Stephens (brother); Joseph Rayner Stephens (brother)

Edward Stephens (19 October 1811 – 12 March 1861) was an English-born banker and one of the earliest settlers in the Colony of South Australia. He was the cashier of the South Australian Company, manager of the South Australian Banking Company, and later a nominated member of the Legislative Council. One of the founders of Methodism in South Australia, he chaired the South Australian League for the Maintenance of Religious Freedom.

== Early life ==
Stephens was born in London, the son of Rev. John Stephens (1772–1841) who had been president of the Wesleyan Methodist Conference. His nine other siblings included John (1806–1850) later editor and proprietor of the South Australian Register and Samuel (1808–1840), the South Australian Company's first colonial manager, and the Wesleyan minister and agitator, Joseph Rayner Stephens (1805-1879).

From 1833 until 1836 Stephens worked at the Hull Banking Company. In 1836 he joined the South Australian Company as cashier and accountant. He sailed for South Australia on the Coromandel with his wife Emma Baron and several other Wesleyan families, arriving at Holdfast Bay on 17 January 1837, only a few weeks after the proclamation of the colony. Stephens was in charge of the entire set up of the bank, which included not only £10,000 in small notes and specie, but also a pre-cut timber-framed banking-house and iron chests that had accompanied him on the Coromandel. He soon set up business in a large tent on the sand hills at Glenelg.

When the exact location of the capital city was decided, Stephens bought 8 acres (3.2 ha) of land in the new city of Adelaide. The new settlers moved their camp from the sand hills to the banks of the River Torrens and Stephens erected a wooden house, one room of which was devoted to religious service. He became a close friend of the surveyor-general, Colonel William Light.

When the company's banking business was separated from its other operations in 1840, Stephens was appointed manager of the newly incorporated South Australian Banking Company. The local board consisted of George Morphett, R. F. Newland and Edmund Isaac Stephen Trimmer (E. I. S. Trimmer). He successfully held this post through the colony's commercial depression of the early 1840s, despite the bank losing the Government's account over difficulties complying with Governor Grey's administration.

At the discovery of minerals in the South Australian colony, Stephen's sent samples of copper and silver-lead ore to England for testing. Among the first to visit the Burra copper deposits, his energetic promotion of the finds proved highly profitable for the bank.

Outside of his working and religious life, Stephens was appointed a justice of the peace, and was chairman of the Agricultural and Horticultural Society from 1847 to 1848. He was also a nominated member of the Legislative Council and at the South Australian Legislative Council election of 1853 he contested West Adelaide as a conservative and although defeated, he was afterwards appointed to the Council as a government nominee.

== Religion ==
A committed Wesleyan, like his father, Stephens took a leading role in establishing the Methodist movement in Adelaide. The first Methodist sermon was led by John White on 22 January 1837, from Stephen's business tent at Glenelg, Holdfast Bay. The state's first class meetings were held in his home on North Terrace, and he was largely responsible for the building of the city's first two Methodist chapels, the first being on Hindley Street at the back of the Bank's building in 1838. The foundation stone of the Hindley street chapel was laid by Mrs. Edward Stephens. When the Rev. William Longbottom arrived in Adelaide in 1838, after being shipwrecked near Cape Jaffa on the Fanny on his way from Tasmania to Western Australia, the Wesleyan community convinced the minister to stay and Stephen's provided a home for the family.

In 1846, Governor Robe's administration made public money available to religious denominations for the building of churches and schools and the payment of ministers. Stephens chaired the League for the Maintenance of Religious Freedom, a lobby group formed to oppose the grants. Its members, drawn from a range of faiths, argued that South Australia had been founded as a place of religious liberty without a dominant church, and that state aid breached that founding principle. Because funding was allocated according to the number of adherents recorded in the census, the League argued the scheme favoured larger denominations at the expense of smaller religious communities and made religion subservient to a political agenda.

Among the Wesleyans, the question was decided at the Quarterly Meeting of January 1847, which voted fifteen to eight to accept the money. The decision caused dissension within the church, the withdrawal of some members, and the formation of a small schismatic body, the Representative Methodist Church. Stephens was a leading lay opponent of the decision, campaigning against state aid, signing petitions and writing letters to the Register, the newspaper edited by his brother, John Stephens. The issue came to a head during the 1851 Legislative Council elections and State Aid was abolished. Whilst others returned to the main Methodist church, Stephens had severed his connection and remained uninvolved until his departure from the colony

== Later life ==
Stephens left Adelaide in 1855, touring the eastern Australian colonies before settling in London, where he continued to work in the interests of South Australia as a member of various committees.

He died at Howard Lodge, Maida Vale, on 12 March 1861, aged 49 and was buried at West Norwood Cemetery. The death notice carried in The Times, and reprinted in the Adelaide press, recorded that "he opened the South Australian Bank at Adelaide, and for many years was its faithful and devoted Manager". His wife Emma (née Baron) died at Howard Lodge on 4 December 1871.
