= Violet de Mole =

Violet de Mole (14 June 1874 – 21 August 1946) was a teacher of French in Adelaide, South Australia.

== History ==
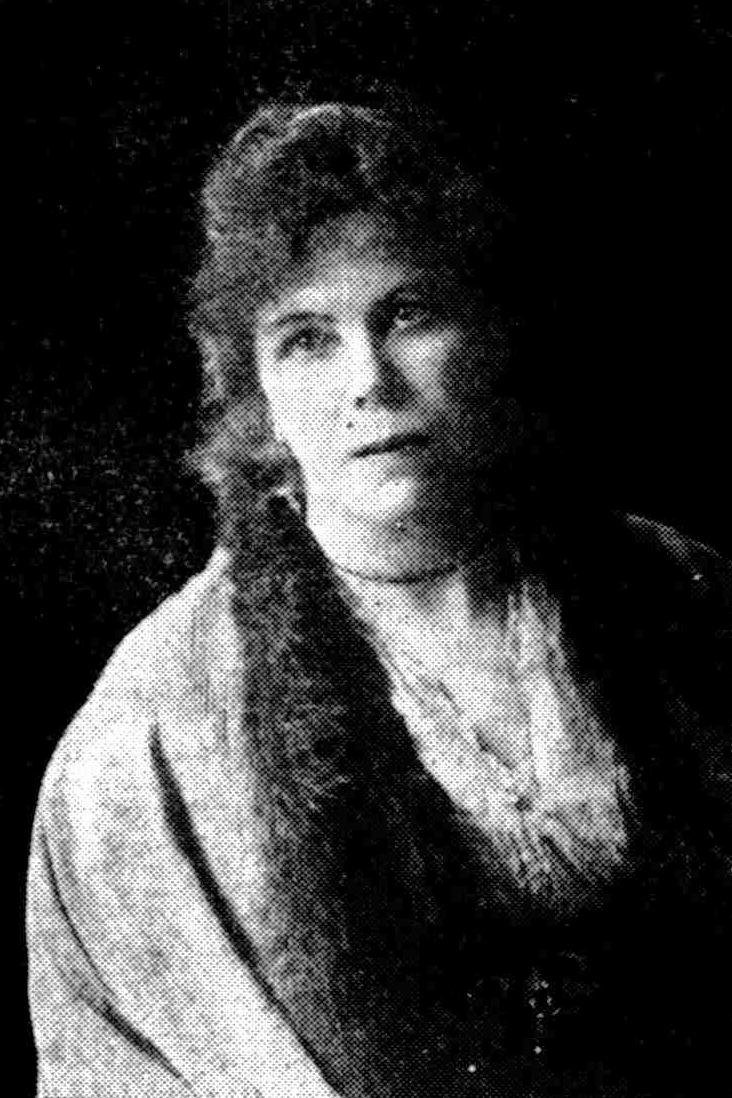
Violet de Mole in 1917

De Mole was born in Glenelg, South Australia, to Ernest Maudslay de Mole (1841–1876) and Margaret Jane Stevenson (1844–1918), who married in 1868. Margaret was a daughter of George Stevenson, secretary to Governor Hindmarsh and first editor of the South Australian Register. She had a sister (Annie) Evelyn de Mole (16 March 1873 – 12 January 1952).

De Mole was a student at the Advanced School for Girls, then began teaching at Tormore House School, North Adelaide, sometime around 1900. No record has been found of earlier studies; it is likely she was educated at home by her mother.

She spent a year at Écouen, a school founded by Napoleon in 1806 for the daughters of his fallen soldiers. She studied French phonology under Paul Passy, and was awarded the diploma of the Guilde Internationale, of which Edith Williams was president.

In 1907 she was appointed examiner in French for the Bachelor of Arts degree at the University of Adelaide, relinquishing the position in 1912, when she returned to Paris, remaining for a few years, after which she coached students for the Arts degree.

She lived in France 1920–1921, studying language at the Sorbonne and teaching English at Écouen. She studied phonetics at the École des Hautes Études, under Professor Paul Passy, and Abbé Rousselot at the College de France, and achieved the distinction of Maitresse de Phonetique.

== Other interests ==
De Mole was a founding member of the Adelaide Lyceum Club and its vice-president to 1938. She founded a circle for practising conversational French. She took Parisian newspapers and kept abreast of French and Australian politics and literature. She gave radio talks on such subjects.

She also belonged to the Women Graduates' Association, Alliance Française (founder of its Adelaide chapter), the Pioneers' Association, and the Modern Language Association.

From around 1930 De Mole and her sister Evelyn shared a house in Aldgate, just behind the railway station, where they created a lovely garden. She had a talent for interior decoration, and shared with her family a delight in collecting valuable objets d'art appropriate to their lifestyle. She was noted for her artistic flair and zest for life.

She had an interest in the life and times of her grandfather, John Bamber de Mole (c. 1798 – c. 1845), (Note: John Bamber de Mole was also father of artist Fanny Elizabeth de Mole.) and was preparing data for his biography when she died.

== Recognition ==
A few months after her death, a committee was formed to devise a fitting memorial. Members included Mrs T. Slaney Poole, Mrs Roy Milne, Mrs E. S. McLaren, Mrs George Bryce, Sir William Mitchell, Lady Mawson, Professor J. G. Cornell, (Note: Cornell was Professor of French, University of Adelaide.) Mrs Howard Davenport, (Note: Davenport (of Aldgate) was manager of Executor Trustee and Agency.) Mrs Carew Reynell, Ethel Cooper, Mabel Hardy, J. G. Duncan-Hughes, Edward Povey, (Note: Povey was lawyer with Symon, Rounsevell, & Symon.) Hugh Gooch, (Note: Gooch was pastoralist and grazier) and W. J. Gunson. (Note: William Joseph Gunson (c. 1871 – 3 November 1946) was a solicitor and French Consul.) They resolved to found an annual Violet de Mole Prize for the top third-year student of French at the university, funded from the interest on a £256 endowment. They also provided for a Violet de Mole French Library within the Barr Smith Library.
