= George McEwin =

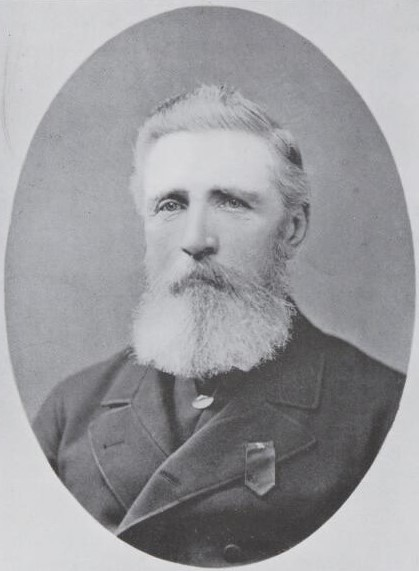

George McEwin (29 January 1815 – 8 August 1885) was a gardener and orchardist in the early days of South Australia, remembered today as the founder of Glen Ewin jams and preserves.

McEwin was born in Scotland, and worked in the gardens of the Duke of Buccleugh at Drumlanrig Castle in Scotland, then in the Liverpool nurseries of M. Skirving. He married Jessie Kennedy (12 July 1810 – 21 September 1884) in Liverpool in 1839. They emigrated to South Australia on the Delhi, arriving in Adelaide on 20 December 1839. He worked as head gardener for George Stevenson, and planted what may have been South Australia's first vines at North Adelaide in 1837. Stevenson was private secretary to Governor Hindmarsh, arriving on HMS Buffalo at Holdfast Bay on 28 December 1836.

He visited Sydney and collected a large number of fruit trees and vines, which he planted on Stevenson's extensive property between Melbourne and Finniss streets, and which thrived under his care. He planted a small plot with wheat; arguably the first in South Australia, though Charles George Everard and Donald McLean are at least as plausible.

In 1843 he purchased land near Houghton which he named "Glen Ewin", where he planted extensive orchards and settled in 1844. He worked for George A. Anstey (1815–1895, for whom Ansteys Hill is named) establishing the garden and orchards of his Highercombe Estate, now part of Tea Tree Gully. From 1850 he and apple grower William Dunn worked for Anstey setting up the orchard and gardens for his nearby Paracombe Estate.

Around 1863 McEwin founded a jam factory, which he operated with his son Robert McEwin, to make use of excess fruit. He sold 20 acres (8.1 ha) of his land to the building firm of English & Brown (later Brown & Thompson) for a quarry, noted for its freestone.

At the height of their business they employed over 100 people and purchased much of the fruit in the region. Besides the Glen Ewin brand, their jam was also marketed as Kingurli, Viking, Anchor, Arab and Far West. In December 1962 Sir Thomas Playford unveiled a plaque commemorating 100 years of jam making at Glen Ewin. The business failed in the late 1980s; the factory closed in 1988, and the property deteriorated considerably. The Glen Ewin name was revived in the 1990s for a range of jams made by Henry Jones IXL, which was bought by SPC Ardmona in 2004 but none of these products was made at Houghton.

In 1991 the Wauchope family bought the property and began resurrecting Glen Ewin as a fig orchard in 1994. Their company Willabrand now supplies fresh figs locally, interstate and overseas.

== Other interests ==
- He was for many years connected with the Agricultural and Horticultural Society, and its President in 1862.
- He regularly attended the Houghton Congregational Church and was for twenty eight years a personal friend of its pastor, the Rev. W. J. Webster.

== Public life ==
- He was appointed a Justice of the Peace.
- He acted as Returning Officer for the district of Gumeracha
- He was a member of the Central Road Board
- He was a member of the Forest Board

== Publications ==
- In 1843 he published by subscription the South Australian Vigneron and Gardeners' Manual which passed through several editions.
- He contributed a monthly "Farmers', Gardener and Vignerons' Calendar" for the Advertiser.
- He frequently commented in the press on the culture of various trees and plants and other subjects.
- In 1881 he took a journey up the River Murray and wrote a report of his trip for the South Australian Register.
- In 1884 he visited Port Lincoln and wrote an article for the Register.
- He wrote the Farm and Garden calendars for the Register and Observer Almanacs. He was succeeded as their agricultural reporter by Albert Molineux.
- He wrote an article on Australia's native forests for the Scottish Arboricultural Society.

== Family ==
He was a brother of Robert Daniel McEwin (1820 – 13 November 1900) of Golden Grove. Their father John McEwin (ca.1792–1855) died at Heidelberg (Victoria ?)

He married Jessie Kennedy (1810 – 21 September 1884), who was born at Dumfriesshire, Scotland. They had six children:

- Mary Bartlett McEwin (17 August 1839 – 1889) married George Philip Doolette (later Sir George) (24 January 1840 – January 1924) on 9 November 1865. George made a fortune in gold mining with George Brookman at Kalgoorlie and retired to England. He married a second time, to Lillie Dale of Birmingham.
- Margaret Hester (11 January 1842 – 13 April 1864) married William Duncan on 30 July 1863. She died giving birth to twins.
- Jessie (25 July 1843 – 17 October 1925) married Frederick Joseph Lewis (ca.1841 – 2 July 1911) of Gumeracha on 12 October 1867 homes Georgetown, Joslin
- Elizabeth ( – 17 August 1894) married John Tasker (ca.1840 – 15 November 1921) of Norwood on 13 February 1868
- Rev. John McEwin (1845 – 9 May 1894) married Agnes Henderson (1850 – 15 May 1936) daughter of Rev. James Henderson in 1872, lived in North Adelaide. Their children included:

- George McEwin (1873 – 5 August 1945) married Evelyn Jones (1876 – 11 February 1949) on 28 April 1906.

- Eliza Ramsay McEwin (1875– ) married Robert Bruce ( – ) in 1899.
- (James) Guthrie McEwin (1878– )
- Jessie McEwin (1880– )
- (John) Oswald McEwin (1883– )

- Robert McEwin, JP. (23 November 1847 – 20 September 1929) married Emily Longbotham (1851 – 5 November 1939) in 1872. He was chairman of George McEwin & Sons and Superintendent of Houghton Sunday School.

For some years he was in poor health, and prior to his death he was confined to his room for two months, suffering from a heart condition, but his death was somewhat sudden and unexpected.

== Recognition ==
- For the report he wrote for the Scottish Arboricultural Society he received in 1881 the Society's silver medal.

== Bibliography ==
- South Australian Vigneron and Gardeners' Manual published by James Allen 1843. Originally sold by subscription, and revised 1864, but was long out of print when a second edition appeared in 1871.
