= Adelaide Chronicle and South Australian Literary Record =

Australian newspaper

The Adelaide Chronicle (full title: The Adelaide Chronicle, and South Australian Literary Record) was an early publication in Adelaide, the capital of the then province of South Australia. It was published between 1839 (186 years ago) and 1842 (183 years ago), when it ceased publication as a result of the economic depression caused by the mass exodus of workers to the Victorian goldfields.

== History ==
Adelaide's three earliest newspapers all commenced in 1839: The Egotist, the Adelaide Guardian, both of which folded in their first year, and the Adelaide Chronicle published by Robert Thomas of 37 Hindley Street, and the founder of the South Australian Gazette and Colonial Register (edited by George Stevenson). Given the "bitter rivalries" between The Register and The Southern Australian newspapers at the time, the intention was to publish a more neutral newspaper.

=== Adelaide Chronicle and South Australian Advertiser ===
This was one of the earliest publications in the new province of South Australia, being published between 10 December 1839 and 20 May 1840. The newspaper was initially owned and printed by William Caddy Cox, and edited by Oliver K. Richardson. After three months, it was sold to Robert Thomas, edited by James Frederick Bennett, and released weekly on Wednesdays.

=== Adelaide Chronicle and South Australian Literary Record ===
In late May 1840, the newspaper was renamed (given that "a journal devoted partly to literature has hitherto been much wanted"), continuing the publication order of its predecessor. It was published between 27 May 1840 and 18 May 1842. A notice on page 2 of the final edition read:

TO THE READERS OF THE CHRONICLE One of the natural consequences of the extreme depression of the time is the falling off of newspaper readers, and the diminution of what constitutes the main ingredient of newspaper prosperity - advertisements. [...] In accordance with that determination the Chronicle will not be again issued until further notice.
