= South Australian Vigneron and Gardeners' Manual =

Book written by George McEwin

The South Australian Vigneron and Gardeners' Manual (July 1843) was the first gardening book published (and one of the first books locally written and published) in the newly founded colony of South Australia.

It was written by George McEwin (1815 – 1885), then gardener to vigneron George Stevenson, published by James Allen, and sold by subscription at 3s. then retailed at 4s.

== Subscribers ==
The list of subscribers reads like a "Who's Who" of SA colonists. At 24 June 1843 they were:

His Excellency the Governor (10 copies)
His Honour the Judge (2)
James Allen, North Adelaide (6)
Capt. Allen, Port Gawler
George Alston, Sturt River
G. A. Anstey (2)
David Ball, Vine Farm, Prospect
John Berjew, North Adelaide
Charles Berkeley, Cranford
William Blyth, Hindley Street
C. F. Bonner
Joseph Bouch, Hindley Street (2)
John Bradford, Sturt River
Alex. Brodie, Claremont Cottage
Lewis Bryant (2)
W. H. Burford, Grenfell Street
T. Burr
John Calder, Port Adelaide
G. L. Cooper, Hindmarsh
John Cousins, Brighton
James Coutts
K. J. F. Crawford
J. D. Finnis, North Adelaide
C. Davies, M.D., North Adelaide (2)
Rev. R. Drummond, Brownhill Creek (6)
George Duke, South Terrace
J. S. Duncan, Reed-beds
E. N. Emmett, Lyndoch Valley (2)
C. G. Everard, Ashford
S. Fairlie, Hindley Street
Charles Fenn, Kensington
Flett and Linklater, Hindley Street (2)
John Foreman, South Terrace
C. E. Fortnimin (3)
A. Foster
James Frew, Fullarton (2)
Lieut Frome (2:)
Samuel D. Gill
Osmond Gilles, Glen Osmond
John Guthrie, Fairfield
R. L. Hall
Jean Harkness, Grahamshall
Alexander Hay, Little Para
William Hay, North Adelaide
William Higginson, Kensington
H. D. Hilton, Grenfell Street
J. Humphrey, Islington
J. A. Jackson (2)
H. Johnson (3)
A. C. Kelly M.D., Morphett Vale
W. G. Lambert, Grenfell Street
H. W. Litchfield, Grenfell Street
W. Little, Mount Barker
H. Manfull, Challaston Grove
C. Mann, Syleham, on the Torrens (3)
R. Miller, Hindley Street
Capt. John Mitchell, Mount Barker (2)
T. J. Mitchell, North Adelaide
T. N. Mitchell, Mount Barker (2)
Capt. W. C. Mitchell, ship Frankfeld (2)
Jacob Barrow Montefiore
R. L. Montefiore
A. M. Mundy (3)
W. H. Newenham, North Terrace
Thomas Norris, North Adelaide
P. Peachey, Kermode Street
C. G. Platts, Hindley Street (6)
Edward Roberts, Pine Forest
John Roedan, Lyndoch Valley
Thomas Round, Weymouth Street
William Seargeant, Log House Farm
Matthew Smith, Gawler Place
Emanuel Spiller, Grenfell Street
George Stevenson, North Adelaide (6)
Samuel Stocks, jun., Grenfell Street
Captain Sturt (2)
David Sutherland, Sturt River
John Taylor, Bank of South Australia
W. K. Thomas, Kermode Street
Edmund Trimmer, North Adelaide
John and James Turner
M. Turton, Rundle Street
J. Walker, Havering, on the Torrens (2)
John Warden, North Adelaide
J. Wetherspoon, Franklin Street
Nathanial Wheaten, Park Farm
Frederic Wicksteed, Adelaide
John T. Wicksteed, Taranake, New Zealand
Thomas Williams, Hermitage
E. Wright, jun., North Terrace
George Young, Port Adelaide

The Public Library of South Australia produced a facsimile edition in 1962.
