= The Camperdown Chronicle =

The Camperdown Chronicle is the local newspaper of the Australian town of Camperdown, Victoria. The Chronicle was first printed on 1 October 1874 by proprietor and editor, James Allen. Published three times a week it covers news from the Western District of Victoria as well as Geelong and Melbourne.
