= Margaret Stevenson (satirist) =

Australian writer

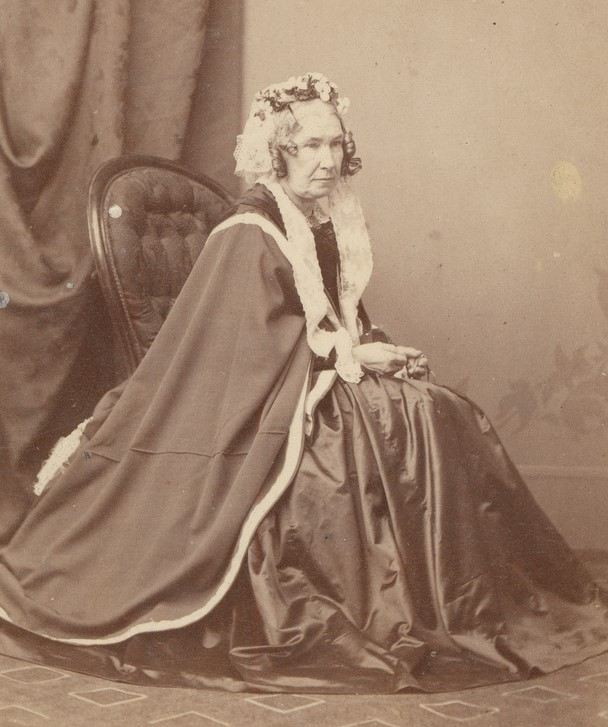

Margaret Stevenson (c. 1807 – 28 September 1874) was an English-Australian writer. She was well known as a satirist and columnist in Adelaide where she wrote under the pseudonym "A Colonist" for the South Australian Gazette and Colonial Register.

She married George Stevenson in 1836.

== Sources ==
- "General news". The Express and Telegraph. Adelaide. 29 September 1874 – via Trove.
