= South Australian Gazette and Mining Journal =

Australian newspaper

The South Australian Gazette and Colonial Register (from 5 July 1845) and South Australian Gazette and Mining Journal (from 9 October 1847) was a weekly publication in the colony of South Australia which included notices from and about the government between 1845 and 1852.

== History ==
The colony of South Australia's first publication, called South Australian Gazette and Colonial Register, changed its name on 15 June 1839 to become the South Australian Register. Later, in 1845, publisher George Stevenson appropriated the vacancy by publishing his own version under the same name. According to the State Library of South Australia:

George Stevenson founded the South Australian Gazette and Mining Journal, originally and confusingly titled the South Australian Gazette and Colonial Register after Adelaide's first newspaper. Stevenson edited the South Australian Register with an aggressive outspokenness, and continued this approach in his new title. He stated he would be campaigning for free trade, reduced taxes, alterations to the scheme of land sales. Most of all, this newspaper led the call for fully representative government. The newspaper’s title change reflected the founding of major mine ventures at Burra and elsewhere. The earlier spirited inter-press debate continued with this fourth major newspaper, alongside the Register, South Australian, and Adelaide Times. ... The newspaper was forced to close in 1852 due to the lack of labour and cash brought by the exodus of men to the Victorian goldfields. Faced with his entire staff leaving for the gold rush, Stevenson closed the newspaper and joined them.

Volume 1, number 1 of the South Australian Gazette and Colonial Register was published on Saturday, 5 July 1845. The final edition under that title was Volume III number 118 on 2 October 1847. Volume III number 119 of the South Australian Gazette and Mining Journal was published the following Saturday, 9 October 1847. The publication ceased with the printing of Volume 7, no. 516 (13 March 1852).
