= George Doolette =

Australian mining entrepreneur

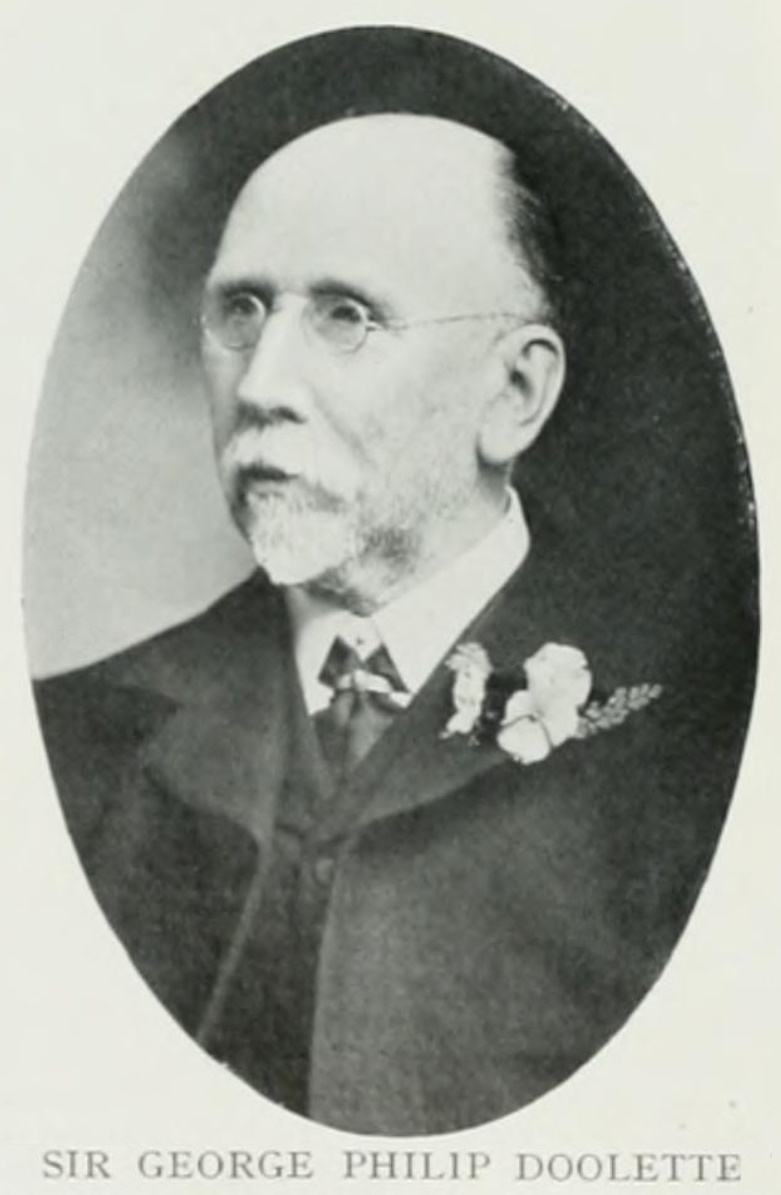
- George P. Doolette (in about 1922).
- Born: 24 January 1840; Dublin, Ireland
- Died: 19 January 1924 (aged 83); Caterham, England
- Occupation: Mining entrepreneur

Sir George Philip Doolette (24 January 1840 – 19 January 1924) was a mining entrepreneur and chairman of the Western Australian Mine Owners' Association. He was an investor in mining ventures, and one of the financial pioneers of the West Australian goldfields.

== Biography ==
=== Early years ===
George Philip Doolette was born on 24 January 1840 at Sandford near Dublin, Ireland, the son of a carpenter, George Dorham Doolette, and of his wife Elizabeth 'Eliza' (née Reynard). George's maternal uncle, a carpenter named George Reynard, had emigrated to South Australia within a few years of the colony's establishment, arriving at Adelaide in December 1837 aboard the Navarino.

In 1855 fifteen year-old George emigrated with his parents to South Australia on the immigrant ship Nashwauk. The ship left Liverpool on 13 February 1855 with 300 (mostly Irish) migrants on board. In the early hours of 13 May, as the Nashwauk neared its destination, the ship ran aground in two fathoms of water near the mouth of the Onkaparinga River, nineteen miles (30 km) from Adelaide. During the following afternoon the passengers were landed and taken to nearby Noarlunga township. The Melbourne steamer and the government schooner Yatala were sent to the scene. Many of the passengers were taken across the Onkaparinga River to Port Noarlunga from where they were conveyed to Adelaide aboard the Melbourne and the Yatala, and the remainder were transported from Noarlunga by bullock-drays.

After arriving at Adelaide the Doolette family initially stayed in George Reynard's family home at Norwood.

=== Adelaide ===
Before emigrating to South Australia with his parents, George had worked for two years "in the soft goods trade". In Adelaide he found a job as cashier with the drapery firm of McNicol and Young, where he worked for two and a half years. Around 1858 he joined the firm of Messrs. A. Macgeorge & Co., tailors, hatters and outfitters of Hindley Street (and later King William Street, Adelaide). A. Macgeorge & Co. had been established in 1849 and was the leading drapery business in Adelaide.

Doolette's father died of a "disease of the heart" on 20 June 1863, aged 49, at 'Sandford Cottage' in the Adelaide suburb of Kensington.

On 9 November 1865 George Doolette married Mary Bartlett McEwin, the eldest daughter of orchardist George McEwin. The marriage was conducted at McEwin's 'Glen Ewin' estate, in the Adelaide Hills near Houghton, South Australia. The couple lived initially at Kensington and were closely connected with the local Clayton Congregational Church. They later moved to a North Terrace residence in the city where they attended Stow Memorial Church. The couple had three children, two sons and a daughter, born in the period 1869 to 1876.^{[A]}

By 1864 Doolette had been appointed as manager of A. Macgeorge & Co. and assistant to the proprietor Alexander Macgeorge. In about 1867 Doolette was made a partner in the drapery business with Macgeorge. Doolette was an active member of the South Australian Chamber of Manufactures after its formation in May 1869.

In May 1873 Doolette opened his own drapery business, Messrs. G. Doolette & Co., at Moonta on the Yorke Peninsula of South Australia. It was reported that "Mr. Doolette comes to the Peninsula with a high reputation in the trade, obtained in Adelaide". His business in Moonta was the local agent for the Adelaide Marine and Fire Assurance Company. While living at Moonta Doolette invested in the South Moonta Mining Company and in June 1874 he chaired a meeting of shareholders of the company.

In March 1875, following the retirement of Alexander Macgeorge, Doolette left Moonta to return to Adelaide after becoming the sole proprietor of Messrs. Macgeorge & Co. After the transfer of the business Doolette operated from the same premises in King William Street under his own name. The business continued operating until 1890.

In 1880 George and Mary Doolette left South Australia for a visit to Europe and Britain. They left from Adelaide on 16 May 1880 aboard the R.M.S. Hydaspes and arrived in England in August. While the couple were in Scotland Mary Doolette suffered a severe attack of bronchitis. George and Mary Doolette arrived back in Australia in January 1881 via the R.M.S. Hydaspes.

In the 1880s when land in suburban Adelaide at Parkside and Unley was subdivided for sale, Doolette "was a heavy buyer" of allotments for investment purposes. In Adelaide Doolette was a respected businessman and a supporter of philanthropic causes. In 1887 he was appointed as a justice of the peace. He served as vice-president of the Young Men's Christian Association in 1884-85, president of the Congregational Union in 1885-86 and was an office-bearer of the London Missionary Society.

Doolette's eldest son, George McEwin Doolette, died on 22 June 1888 at the family home at Blackwood, aged eighteen years. The cause of his death was described as "consumption of the throat". George had worked in his father's business after leaving school. In 1887, "in order to acquire greater experience", he travelled to London where he worked "in a business house", but became ill over the English winter. He returned to Adelaide in April 1888, but succumbed to his illness two months later.

In 1889 Doolette and Philip Charley formed a partnership to purchase 'Narrung' station on Lake Albert, near the mouth of the Murray River.

Mary Doolette died on 19 February 1890, after a serious illness, at her residence at Blackwood in the Adelaide foothills.

Doolette was selected as a delegate of the Congregational Union of South Australia to the International Council to be held in London in July 1891. In early 1892 Doolette undertook a trip to China and Japan.

In common with other Adelaide businessmen, Doolette became a speculator and investor in the early years of silver and lead mining at Broken Hill. From 1890 he was a director of the Yongaleatha Marble, Flag and Flux Company which operated a quarry north-east of Broken Hill. The property of 800 acres contained "a marvellous variety of useful stones and metals" including black marble, ironstone and calcite. At a half-yearly meeting of the Yongaleatha company in August 1892, chaired by Doolette, it was explained that in view of the difficulty of raising "the necessary capital... for carrying out the objects of the company" due to the prevailing severe financial depression, the directors had opened up "negotiations with London, and the matter is now in the hands of an influential gentleman there with the view of securing the amount required". Doolette was also a director of the Moorkaie Mining and Flux Company incorporated in May 1891, operating in an area north-east of Broken Hill.

=== The Golden Mile ===
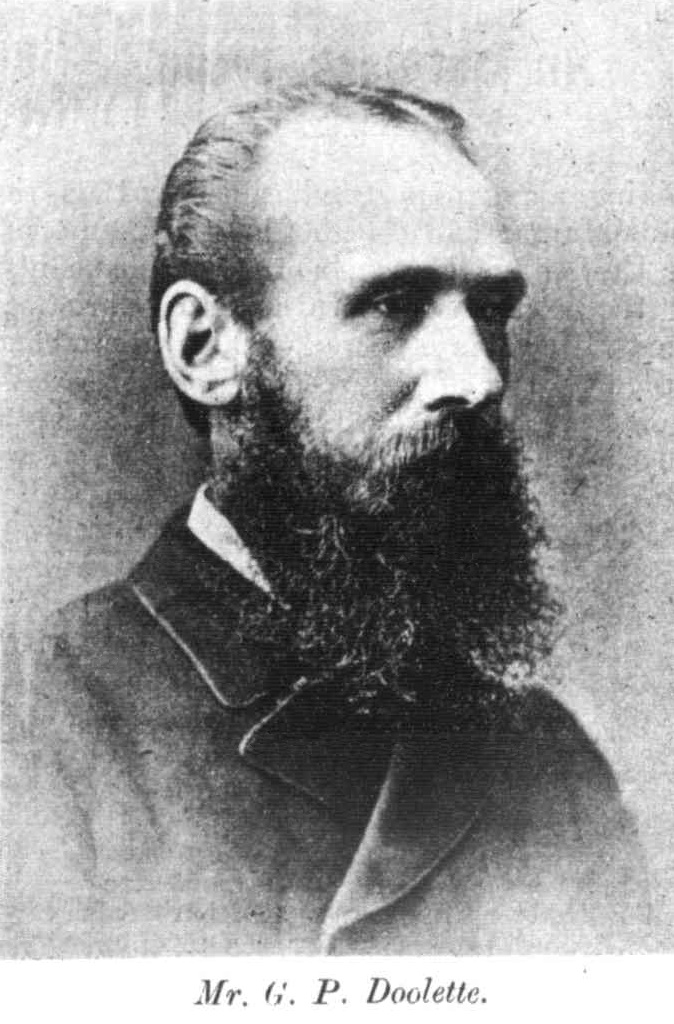
Photograph of George P. Doolette (in the 1890s).

By late 1892 reports began to be published of significant discoveries of gold in the remote country east of Southern Cross in the south-west of Western Australia. The earlier scientific and exploring expedition led by David Lindsay, financed by Sir Thomas Elder and supported by the Royal Geographical Society of Australasia, had noted the presence of an auriferous belt across the region. The news in September 1892 of the discovery of alluvial gold at the future site of Coolgardie by Arthur Bayley and William Ford led to a rush to the locality.

The interest generated in Adelaide by the reports from Western Australia prompted Doolette and a fellow businessman and stockbroker, George Brookman, to explore ways to invest in the opportunity. Brookman's brother William, together with an experienced miner named Sam Pearce, had been prospecting for gold at Dashwood's Gully near Adelaide, with very little success. A syndicate of investors was formed, referred to as the 'Adelaide Prospecting Party', to provide finance for William Brookman and Sam Pearce to travel to the Coolgardie goldfields. The original capital of the syndicate was made up of ten contributing shares of £15 each, plus five fully paid-up shares for the prospectors. In addition to George P. Doolette and George Brookman, the eight other contributing members of the syndicate were: E. Neale Wigg (a director of the Broken Hill Proprietary Company), Messrs. Wilkinson & Harrison (Adelaide stockbrokers), Colin Templeton (Broken Hill bank manager and company director), Dr. James Alexander Greer Hamilton (Adelaide surgeon), William E. J. Brocksopp (a partner in the firm of G. & R. Wills and Co., clothing manufacturers and merchants), Francis D. Hodge (Adelaide businessman and deacon of the Congregational church), Robert James M. McBride (pastoralist) and R. McEwin (possibly Robert McEwin, younger brother of Doolette's late wife).

The two prospectors, William Brookman and Sam Pearce, left Adelaide for Perth on 7 June 1893 aboard the steamer Australia. They travelled east to York where they purchased a spring-dray and two horses in order to convey their equipment and supplies. The pair arrived at Coolgardie on 29 June, where a claim had been offered for sale to the syndicate, but after inspection they decided to decline the sale. Twelve days before their arrival the prospector Paddy Hannan had registered a find of payable gold, by he and his two partners, at a location 24 miles (38 km) to the north-east of Coolgardie. Within days a rush had begun to the location that became known as 'Hannan's Find' (and later Kalgoorlie). Brookman and Pearce decided to visit the new goldfield. Most of the early diggers were searching for alluvial gold, but the two Adelaide miners had purchased a dolly pot to crush quartz samples from potentially gold-bearing reefs. While they were camped on a six-acre block in the ironstone hills to the south of 'Hannans' (later known as Central Boulder), leased by miners named Flynn and Tucker, the two prospectors dollied some stone for the owners. The results were exceedingly good and the next morning Pearce pegged out the nearby Ivanhoe lease, "situated on a low, scrubby hill, with ironstone blows surrounding it, and contains no less than five well-defined quartzite and iron reefs". While Brookman was away in Coolgardie to register the Ivanhoe lease, Pearce discovered a large gold-rich reef at a nearby location, that became known as the Great Boulder claim.

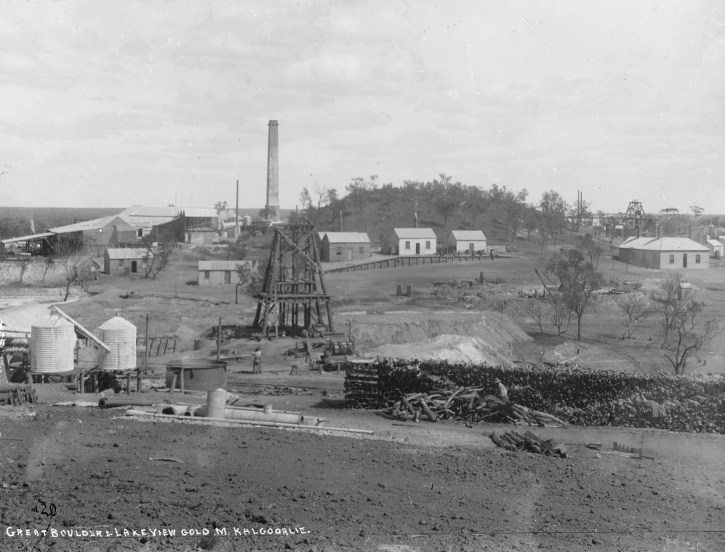
The Great Boulder and Lake View Gold Mines at Kalgoorlie (photographed in 1894).

When the Adelaide syndicate was informed by telegram of the finds, a meeting of the members decided to instruct the prospectors "to continue acquiring claims" wherever the indications were positive. A telegram was sent directing them to "go on pegging". Brookman and Pearce continued as instructed, making careful tests at every locality before acquiring the lease. The prospectors took up a total area of 330 acres (133.5 hectares). Their leases and surrounding mines later became known as the 'Golden Mile'. As the company began to develop the leases, in order to provide the necessary capital, two further companies were floated, one in Melbourne and the other in Adelaide. It was decided to float the Ivanhoe lease as a subsidiary company in Melbourne, with George Brookman travelling there for that purpose. The capital of the new company consisted of thirty thousand shares at ten shillings each. After a slow start the shares were sold after it was announced that an eastern lode with very high assay results was to be mined. The next company floated was the Lake View and Boulder East, made up of two 24-acre blocks, with capital of eighty thousand shares at ten shillings each. A contract was entered into with Forwood, Downs and Co. to transport the first stamp battery to the Kalgoorlie goldfields.

In September 1893 the eleven members of the Adelaide Prospecting Party formed the Coolgardie Gold-Mining and Prospecting Company in order to finance the works required to operate the mines. The capital of the company was agreed to be one thousand shares of five pounds each. One hundred paid-up shares were divided amongst the eleven members. The elected directors of the new company were Doolette, James Marshall, J. F. Cudmore, W. F. Wilkinson and Colin Templeton.

By early 1894 the company decided to send Doolette to England to raise capital. The directors of the company were under cash flow pressure to comply with labour conditions imposed by Western Australian mining laws which required constant employment of a large workforce on the different claims. On 14 February 1894 Doolette left Adelaide for London aboard the R.M.S. Himalaya. He had sent his son Dorham Longford Doolette, then in his early twenties, to the Western Australian goldfields "to watch over his interests... and keep him advised as to developments".^{[B]}

=== England ===
George Doolette arrived in London in early 1894 to float the Great Boulder Proprietary and other mines of the Kalgoorlie goldfields, but he was "confronted with unexpected obstacles and found his task far from easy". The Australian banking crisis of 1893, involving the collapse or suspension of deposit withdrawals from many commercial banks and building societies and a subsequent general economic depression in the Australian colonies, was fresh in the mind of British investors. After "three or four months of weary endeavour" Doolette met John Waddington who assisted in the floating of Great Boulder, the success of which led to the remainder of the 'Golden Mile' mines being placed upon the market.

The Great Boulder Proprietary Gold Mines Ltd. was floated in London on 20 June 1894, one of the earliest Western Australian gold-mining companies to be registered on the London Stock Exchange. The object of the float was to acquire Great Boulder claims at Kalgoorlie. The capital was £175,000 in one pound shares, of which one hundred thousand were offered for subscription to the public. Doolette was one of the directors of the company.

In December 1894 Doolette formed a corporation named the Associated Gold Mines of Western Australia Ltd., which absorbed the balance of the claims held by the Coolgardie Gold Mining Prospecting Company. George Brookman joined Doolette in London to assist in the financial adjustments.

In 1894 Doolette was admitted as a fellow of the Royal Colonial Institute in London.

In 1895 the Great Boulder and Lake View Mines were successfully floated in Britain in order to access the rich underground reefs. The Great Boulder Gold Mines Limited was formed at this time.

On 25 September 1895 in Birmingham George Doolette married Fanny Lillie Robinson (née Dale), the daughter of Dr. R. W. Dale the eminent theologian of the Congregational church in Birmingham.

Doolette remained in London as a mining promoter and administrator. The original Coolgardie Prospecting Syndicate was gradually extended into a cluster of mining companies". By January 1896 Doolette was a member of about twenty boards of directors He was the chairman of directors of the Great Boulder Proprietary Gold Mines Ltd. and Oroya Brown Hill Co. Ltd. and a director of Sons of Gwalia Ltd. By 1896 the mines had a market value of nearly five and a half million pounds. Only a few of the original shareholders "benefited to any great extent by the phenomenal development of the property". Doolette and George Brookman held their shares throughout and were "said to be millionaires". Following some of the early adverse reports from the mines many of the original shareholders "pocketed a small profit instead of waiting to see how the mines would turn out".

In October 1898 the original syndicate was formally wound up, dividing up dividends to the few remaining members that began with a total working capital of £150 in 1893. After distributing £950,000 in shares and £3,421,000 in cash, the remaining syndicate members found themselves holding shares in eight mines to the value of £9,275,075 (see table below), making aggregate assets of £13,646,750.

Syndicate share valuations (as at October 1898):

Great Boulder	£ 1,662,500
Lake View Consols	£ 2,812,500
Associated Mines	£ 2,475,000
Ivanhoe	£ 1,875,000
Kalgoorlie Mint	£ 100,000
Lake View South	£ 220,000
Lake View Extended	£ 65,750
Great Boulder No. 1	£ 65,000
Total	£ 9,275,750

In late 1902 Doolette was elected president of the Council of the Western Australian Mine Owners. In 1907 Doolette was made a fellow of the Royal Geographical Society.

Doolette and his wife visited Australia in 1907. He arrived at Kalgoorlie on 11 January 1907, his first visit to the mining town.

In England Doolette and his wife lived at 'Merlebank' at Caterham Valley in Surrey.

During World War I Doolette served as president of the Australian Voluntary Hospital at Wimereux and he also took an active interest in the Australian Red Cross. Doolette was knighted in June 1916.

Lady Lillie Doolette died on 18 August 1916 at 'Merlebank' at Caterham Valley.

In 1922 it was written of Doolette that he was "a warm and open-handed supporter of everything Australian". In later years Doolette resigned from some of his directorships "owing to indifferent health".

George Doolette died on 19 January 1924 at his residence at Caterham. He was cremated and his ashes were dispatched to Adelaide where they were interred in his first wife's grave in the North Road Cemetery.

== Notes ==
A.The three children were: George McEwin Doolette (1869–1888); Dorham Longford Doolette (born in 1872) and Mary Elizabeth Doolette (born in 1876).

B.Dorham Longford Doolette was the second born child of George and Mary Doolette, born in 1872. In 1895 Dorham staked a claim at Niagara, 95 miles (153 km) north of Kalgoorlie, that was developed as the Challenge mine. The mine was floated as a company with a capital of £225,000, though no shares were offered to the public as all the shares were privately subscribed by friends of his father.
