= Robert Forsyth Macgeorge =

Scottish businessman in South Australia (1796–1859)

Robert Forsyth Macgeorge (1796 – 26 October 1859) was an early settler of South Australia who is remembered for founding the property which is now the Adelaide suburb of Urrbrae. A number of his children were prominent in the early history of South Australia and other Australian colonies.

== History ==
Robert Forsyth Macgeorge, a tailor of Glasgow, and his wife Elizabeth M. Macgeorge, née Duncan (1801–) and their family emigrated to South Australia aboard the Ariadne, arriving on 13 August 1839. They developed the property they named "Urr brae", now known as Urrbrae. R. F. Macgeorge took over Shepherd's draper's shop on Hindley Street. On what was intended as a visit to the "Old Country", he narrowly avoided being involved in the Admella disaster, then perished when the Royal Charter was wrecked.

== Family ==
Their children included:

- John MacGeorge (1821 – 1 January 1844) died from tuberculosis
- Robert Forsyth Macgeorge, Jnr (1822 – 17 September 1917) married Emily Nichols (c. 1829 – 9 October 1922) on 27 December 1854, died in Dunedin, New Zealand.
- Margaret Macgeorge (c. 1824 – 28 October 1912) married John Stewart Turner (c. 1811 – 7 February 1888) on 29 November 1843
- Alexander Macgeorge JP (c. 1826 – 30 June 1908) took over father's shop, moved it to 40 King William Street, sold to partner George Doolette in 1875. He married Mary Hordern (c. 1829 – 1 October 1860) on 2 August 1851, had home Ballangeich in Mitcham; second marriage to Rachel Elizabeth Luxmoore (c. 1828 – 17 April 1915) on 31 January 1866. They left for Victoria around 1880, died in Malvern.

- Margaret Annie Macgeorge (4 July 1852 – 22 May 1897) married Horace Cobden Talbot (1851 – 25 March 1924) on 19 December 1877. He subsequently married Margaret Leonard Gordon (6 June 1857 – 8 November 1935) on 7 April 1899.
- Leslie Duncan Macgeorge (29 January 1854 – 1939) married Frances Mary Pyke on 17 June 1879
- Stanley Hordern Macgeorge (7 September 1855 – )
- Lucy Edith Macgeorge (1 August 1857 – 7 September 1942) married John Milne (3 November 1854 – 12 July 1934), son of Hon. William Milne, on 11 November 1875.
- Frank Faulding Macgeorge (1859 – 11 July 1924) married Mary Celia Mahony (c. 1866 – 26 April 1929) on 21 February 1891
- Norman Macgeorge (8 July 1872 – 2 September 1952) artist and collector, taught at Glenelg Grammar, Queen's College, Hahndorf College 1891–1895, married May Ina Hepburn (5 May 1882 – 27 August 1970) of Mornington, Victoria on 25 January 1911. May was granddaughter of John Stuart Hepburn.

- Alice Annie Macgeorge (c. 1827– ) may have died before family left Britain, as Elizabeth Macgeorge (born 1830) has been designated "second daughter".
- William Macgeorge (c. 1828 – 2 December 1839) died after falling from his pony.
- Elizabeth "Eliza" Macgeorge (26 August 1830 – ) married Francis Hardey Faulding (23 August 1816 – 19 November 1868) on 16 September 1852. She married again, to Anthony Forster (15 May 1813 – 13 January 1897) on 1 December 1869. They divorced six years later, citing her infidelity with one Stark.
- James Macgeorge (1832 – 9 December 1918) architect and businessman
- David King Macgeorge (23 December 1834 – 28 June 1853) died from caries (tuberculosis) of the thighbone
- (Ebenezer) Farie Macgeorge (8 September 1836 – ) married Catherine "Kate" Thomson (c. 1847 – 28 December 1871) in Coburg, Victoria on 10 April 1871. In Scotland early 1860s: promoted to First Lieutenant with City of Edinburgh Artillery Militia in May 1861. Appointed Surveyor 1865; defined boundary between SA and NSW 1867; with Victorian Geodetic Survey; turned to astronomy: observer at Great Melbourne Telescope 1870–1872 under Robert Ellery, succeeding Albert Le Sueur. Invented an improved clinometer used in diamond drilling, patented 1882. Lived St James Estate, Hawthorn, Victoria; took up with "spiritualist medium" Mrs. Maria Theresa Jackson; was beneficiary of disputed will of miner/pastoralist George Lamont; returned to Scotland c. 1882.
- Ellison Barbara Christina "Ellen" Macgeorge (1839 – 1 October 1924) married Richard Ernest Minchin (c. 1831 – 4 January 1893) on 16 August 1883 (she was his second wife; first wife Ellen Rebecca Minchin (née Ocock) died 6 July 1882).

Born in South Australia:

- Mary Jane Macgeorge (12 April 1941 – 17 July 1920) married John Wood Farrar (c. 1836 – 22 March 1884) on 31 May 1864.
- Charlotte Isabel (Isobel?) Macgeorge (19 May 1842 – 5 September 1930) married Eustace Powhatan Sabine (20 January 1838 – 19 September 1902) on 20 September 1865. He was a brother of Clement Sabine.
- Catherine Turner Macgeorge (1843 – 16 May 1943) married George Francis Wyatt (1834 – 7 June 1900) on 20 September 1865 (a double wedding with sister Charlotte).
- William John Macgeorge (18 April 1845 – 26 May 1903) was manager of the Bank of South Australia's Sydney office, also consul for Peru in NSW.
