= Anthony Forster (Australian politician) =

Australian politician

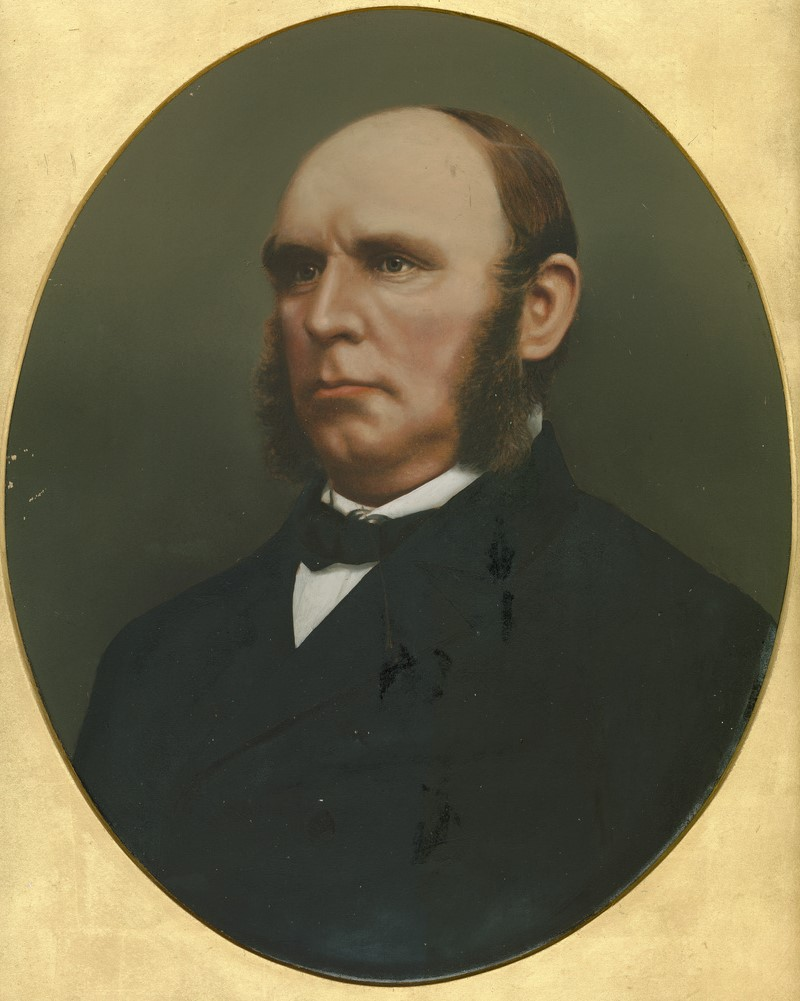

Anthony Forster (15 May 1813 – 13 January 1897) was a politician, financier and newspaper owner/editor in colonial South Australia.

Forster was born in Monkwearmouth, County Durham, England, the son of Anthony Forster, shipwright, and his wife Catherine. Forster arrived in Glenelg, South Australia in the Siam on 25 April 1841.

Forster was for some time editor of the South Australian Register. In 1855 he was elected to the Mixed South Australian Legislative Council for West Adelaide, in opposition to James Hurtle Fisher. The seat was, however, declared vacant by the Court of Disputed Returns in November, Mr. Forster being re-elected on 1 January 1856. When the Constitution Act came into force, Mr. Forster was elected to the Legislative Council for The Province in March 1857, and sat till 2 February 1861, when he retired by rotation, but was immediately re-elected, and sat till December 1864, when he resigned. In 1866 he published "South Australia: its Progress and Prosperity" (London), which gave banker and fellow-parliamentarian George Tinline credit for the Bullion Act of 1852, so mitigating the currency crisis.

Forster died in St Leonards-on-Sea, Sussex, England, predeceased by his wife and all his children,.

== Family ==
Forster married Margaret Gibson Sims (died in London on 6 July 1868) they had four children; all predeceased him.

- Anthony Forster (1846–1847)
- Rose Lambton Forster (1848–1848)
- Anthony Yarwood Forster (1 September 1849 – 28 December 1874) (fell overboard from SS Hesperus, presumed drowned)
- Francis Burnett Forster (1857–1864)

On 1 December 1869 he married Eliza Faulding, the widow of friend Francis Hardey Faulding (1816–1868). He divorced her six years later, citing infidelity with one Stark. Eliza, born sometime around 1830, was the second daughter of Robert F. Macgeorge.
