= South Australian Government Gazette =

Government gazette of South Australia

The South Australian Government Gazette is the government gazette of the South Australian Government.

The South Australian Gazette was first printed on 20 June 1839, after the South Australian Government chose to have its own publication rather than using the local newspaper, South Australian Gazette and Colonial Register, because the publishers were perceived as politically biased. The purpose was to publish government orders and acts with authority of the colonial secretary. Its name was later changed to South Australian Government Gazette from 12 November 1840.
