= Thomas Playford I =

South Australian churchman and farmer

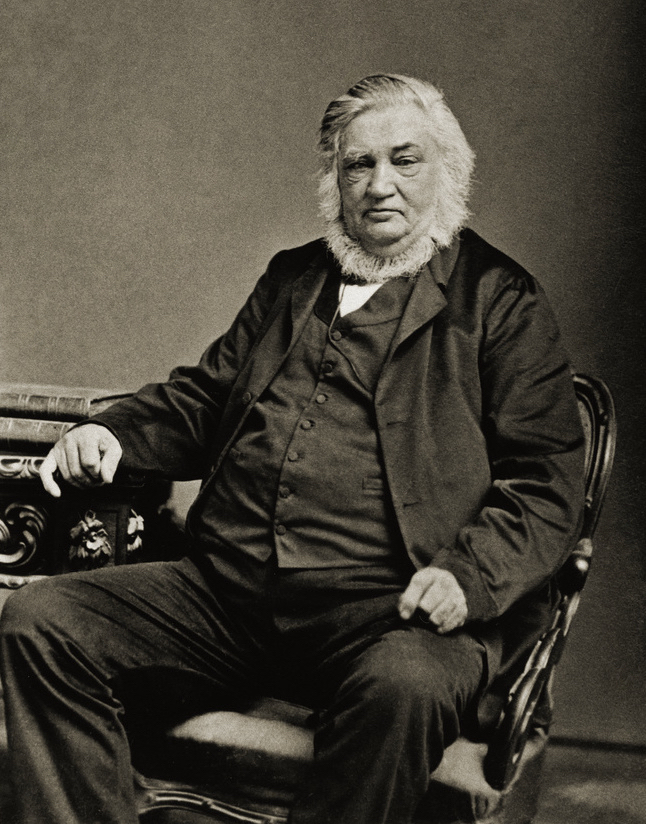
Thomas Playford, about 1865

Thomas Playford (11 August 1795 – 18 September 1873) was a non-conformist minister of religion, teacher and farmer in the early days of the British colony of South Australia. The first-born son of the next three generations were also named Thomas; the second and fourth became premiers of South Australia. His time in South Australia was closely linked with that of his brother, John Playford (born 1810), sister Hannah Welbourn née Playford (1813–1865), and Hannah's husband Thomas Welbourn (1812–1879).

The brothers were ordained ministers, followers of Robert Aitken, with heretical views on the nature of eternal punishment that attracted charges of Socinianism.

== Early life and military career ==
Playford was born in Barnby Dun, West Riding of Yorkshire, England, the eldest son of farmer Thomas Playford (born 1759), and had a happy, carefree childhood. The tall (186 cm (6 ft 1 in)), thoughtful youth was hardly fitted for farm life, and was persuaded to join the army, and in September 1810 enrolled with the 2nd Regiment of Life Guards. He served with in the Battle of Vittoria, the Peninsular Wars and at Waterloo, though he was providentially spared direct combat. According to Stewart Cockburn, Playford was dragooned into the army to avoid a scandal involving an older girl. He returned to England with his regiment in February 1816 and, finding himself with time on his hands, volunteered for teaching and clerical duties. In 1819 he married Mary Anne Corsane; they had two children who died in infancy. He also became interested in religion, and though by birth an Anglican, was for a time influenced by Wesleyan teachings, though seeing some flaws in their arguments. He next was influenced by Rev. Edward Irving, though again confused by the arguments among his followers. His last years with the regiment were spent researching and writing up its history, a task for which he was commended but saw little reward for his efforts. He reached the rank of Lieutenant before being honorably discharged.

=== Canada and London ===
On his discharge from the army he attempted to take up a land grant in Canada, but failed. According to one account his wife and one child died in 1835 and he returned with his remaining daughter Eliza to London. Hussey's account, based on Playford's recollections, had the son dying on their return trip, to be buried at sea, and his wife dying of consumption shortly after their return to London. There he helped the Adjutant-General's department prepare a book on regimental colours. He married again in 1837 to Mary Ann Perry and had a further three children in England, the eldest following the family tradition in being named Thomas. A turning point in his religious life came in 1837 when he heard the Rev. Robert Aitken preach, and joined his "The Christian Society". He was soon appointed an Elder and an approved preacher, but refused to abandon his work on military history. In 1841 a rupture occurred in "The Christian Society" and Playford became leader of one of the few remaining branches.

== Sibling migration to Australia ==
Playford's sister Hannah Playford was also born in Barnby Dun. She married Thomas Welbourn prior to December 1836, when she and her husband migrated to South Australia aboard John Renwick, arriving in February 1837. Playford's brother John Playford, who has been reported as dying aboard that vessel, was preaching in Adelaide in January 1844.

Playford himself would not arrive for another seven years, but on 27 August 1837 Town Acre No. 50, as surveyed by Colonel Light on Hindley Street, Adelaide, was purchased in his name, at a land auction held by the South Australian Company. The grant to Playford would be made out on 27 December 1844. It is assumed that the bidding and payment was made by an agent such as Welbourn or John Playford.

In 1893 that property was still in the family, owned by Thomas Playford II (Note: Delineating the various Thomas Playfords with a generation number is solely for ease of reference in this and related articles; in Australia there is no tradition of referring to "Thomas Playford II" et al. in speech or in writing.) and his brother Edward. A cottage was erected there for Tom and Hannah Welbourn. The Welbourns' first child Thomas Playford Welbourn was born on 12 July 1838, possibly the first white male born on mainland South Australia. (Note: An earlier claim was John Rapid Hoare, born 7 November 1836 near Cygnet River on Kangaroo Island, attended by Dr John Woodforde.) A daughter, Catherine Hannah Welbourn was born on 20 June 1840.

== Life in Australia ==
Playford, his wife Mary Anne Playford (née Perry) and their little family emigrated in 1843 or 1844. Their travel details are unknown.

Playford joined the Adelaide branch of an energetic sect of baptists self-identified as simply "Christians" or "Christian Brethren" and whose first chapel was opened on Bentham Street in 1848. A second was founded in Hindmarsh and a third at Grassy Flat, on the eastern side of present-day Norton Summit. That tiny church, which later became attached to the Baptist denomination, was replaced in 1886 by the 150-seat Norton Summit Baptist Church across the road.

Playford was mainly associated with the Bentham Street chapel, and preached there regularly from 1850 to shortly before he died. A recurring topic of his sermons was the Second Coming of Jesus Christ.

By September 1846, Playford had erected a two-storey premises on his property in Hindley Street, where Thomas and Hannah Welbourn established an eating-house. However Welbourn had become abusive towards his wife, took to drink and went prospecting, and Mrs Welbourn turned the eating-house into a boarding-house.

Hannah Welbourn took her two children to Hobart for a year circa 1855; then to Hatfield, England, near her birthplace, where they stayed with relatives. The Welbourns returned to Adelaide two years later aboard a migrant ship.

Hannah Welbourn's son Thomas Playford Welbourn married Ann Richardson on 12 July 1859. That same year he was operating a cooperage in Flinders Street in partnership with one William Wilkins, then from August 1865 on his own account. In 1869 he advertised to hire six or eight coopers. In 1873 the business became known as Welbourne, Davids, & Co. Welbourn retired in 1886 and died on the anniversary of both his birth and wedding. Welbourne Street, Mitcham, where he lived for fifty years, was named for him.

In 1849 Thomas Welbourn had leased and later purchased Section No. 1079 of 118 acres, near Norton's Summit. Playford took over the Norton's Summit property in 1860. By 1864, part of the property had been sold to H. Norton, who paid £9 10s per acre. Playford also farmed at Mitcham, where he ran a small school, and, on occasion, preached at Bentham Street and Grassy Flat without payment.

Playford donated land on Albert Street, Mitcham for a Christian chapel, which was opened in September 1860. He conducted services there without payment until his death, when the Rev. Tom Capel Davis (died 15 October 1875) became its first stipendiary minister, and the church was admitted to the Baptist Association.

Playford died at his Mitcham home and his remains were buried in the Mitcham Baptist church cemetery, the service conducted by Henry Hussey.

== Publications ==
- Playford, Thomas (1856), Discourses on the second appearing of Christ, and on the changes predicted by the inspired writers in connection with that glorious event, Groombridge; Adelaide : C. Platts Price 3s. 6d.
- Playford, Thomas (1872) Sermons by Rev. Thomas Playford, preached at Bentham St. Chapel, Adelaide publ. W. C. Rigby, 53 Hindley Street. Price 3s. 6d.

== Family and descendants ==
Family and descendants of Revd Thomas Playford
Thomas Playford I married Mary Ann Corsane (1795–1835) in 1819. He married again, to Mary Anne Perry (1805 – 27 April 1872) in 1837. Their children included:
- Eliza Playford (c. 1830 – 26 May 1853), daughter from his first marriage, married Thomas Gratwick.
  - Anne Playford Gratwick (c. 1851 – 12 September 1925) married Rev. Thomas Lees (c. 1831 – 5 September 1920) on 15 May 1879
- Thomas Playford II (26 November 1837 – 19 April 1915) married Mary Jane Kinsman (20 May 1835 – 25 May 1928), daughter of Rev. William Kinsman, on 16 December 1860
  - Thomas Playford III (23 April 1861 – 28 June 1945) married Elizabeth Annie Pellew in 1890
    - Sir Thomas Playford IV (1896–1981)
  - (adopted) Emily Sarah Tomlinson Playford (23 November 1861 – 14 December 1935), daughter of Ann Welbourn, née Richardson. Married cousin Copley Playford (below) in 1888.
  - Mary Anne "Anna" Playford (28 June 1862 – 13 July 1956) married James Duly Prince in 1865. She married again, to John Henry Sexton in 1886
  - (Edward) Copley Playford (22 March 1864 – 17 September 1950) married cousin Emily (above) in 1888. He was a senior public servant in NT
  - Eliza Playford (9 February 1866 – 10 June 1941) married Henry Joseph "Harry" Tuck in 1889
  - Jane Perry Playford (26 February 1868 – 26 June 1950) married James Henry Cowling in 1891
  - John Tomlinson Playford (11 October 1869 – 14 May 1949) married Rose Eliza Inglis in 1893, lived in Brighton, South Australia
    - John Drysdale Playford (18 February 1900 – 16 January 1972) married Margaret Bland (1901–1987)
      - John Playford (1935–2003) historian, assoc. with Stewart Cockburn, author of Playford: Benevolent Despot
    - Maxwell Ernest Playford (14 January 1902 – 10 October 1943) married Agnes Jessie "Nessie" Anderson of Gormanston, Tasmania in 1929. He was a mining engineer, but at the time of his death he was in charge of a major munitions factory in Sydney.
  - Charles Lloyd Playford (2 November 1871 – 9 June 1954) married Annie Young Inglis in 1901
  - Harriet Alice Playford (23 May 1873 – ) married Horace Melbourne Giles in 1893
  - Frank Elliot Playford (10 October 1876 – ) married Ethel Bungey in 1898
  - Mabel "Maisie" Playford (16 December 1878 – c. 1959) married Henry Phipps Onslow on 7 September 1898
- Edward Playford (1841 – 11 June 1900) married Catherine Hannah Welbourn (20 June 1840 – 11 May 1934) on 22 November 1868
  - Leonard Playford (21 October 1869 – 1955) of E.& W.S. Department
  - Frank Playford (23 May 1871 – 1872)
  - Harold Playford (2 January 1873 – 1956) married Florence Murphy on 8 August 1893, with HM Customs at Port Adelaide
    - Hazel Lilian Playford (1 November 1890 – 18 November 1968) married Herbert William Logue, brother of the speech therapist, on 9 September 1916
  - Marie Playford (17 December 1874 – ) lived at "Haverhill", Mitcham, never married
  - Florence Playford (23 September 1876 – ) married Vernon Harridge Edwards (c. 1866–1935) in 1895
  - Nellie Playford (11 September 1878 – 1921)
  - Gertrude Playford (15 September 1885 – 1907)
- John Playford (c. 1842 – 7 June 1920) underwent a serious operation in 1905.

Three born in Adelaide:

- Jane Playford (9 November 1844 – 5 January 1932) married solicitor John Nicholson in 1868
- Sarah Parry Playford (4 January 1847 – 26 December 1927) married Herbert Anderson in 1872
- Harriet Tomlinson Playford (28 April 1848 – 11 January 1927) was a noted contralto; lived in the same Mitcham house all her life.

=== Family of Hannah Welbourn née Playford ===
Hannah Playford (12 May 1813 – 15 February 1865), a sister of Revs. John and Thomas Playford, married Thomas Welbourn (12 October 1812 – 1879). Their family members, many of whom adopted the spelling 'Welbourne', not here observed, include:

- Thomas Playford Welbourn (12 July 1838 – 12 July 1915) married Ann Richardson (5 September 1840 – 18 January 1911) on 12 July 1859.
  - Katherine Hannah Welbourn (2 May 1860 – ) married John August Adamson ( – ) in 1885, lived in Kingscote, Kangaroo Island
  - Emily Sarah Tomlinson Welbourn (23 November 1861 – 14 December 1935), student teacher 1879–1882, was adopted by Thomas Playford, married (Edward) Copley Playford ( – ) in 1888, lived in Port Darwin
  - Albert Edward Welbourn (29 August 1863 – 1925) married Anne Renner (1864 – 9 August 1941) on 17 September 1889; he was resident engineer, South Australian Railways; she was a daughter of Dr. F. E. Renner.
    - Tom Renner Welbourn (13 July 1890 – October 1948)
    - Natalie Estelle Welbourn (30 July 1891 – 24 January 1972) married Edgar Jensen on 25 June 1913
  - Annie Playford Welbourn (3 October 1865 – ) married Rev. William Gilmour on 7 October 1885, moved to Katanning, Western Australia
  - Thomas Middleton Welbourn (25 September 1867 – 15 September 1929) married Alice Annie Laffer (18 June 1869 – 30 August 1949) on 13 April 1898; lived Midland Junction, Western Australia
  - Marion Welbourn (24 June 1869 – ) also student teacher 1883–1884 married Mark King on 1 January 1894, lived in Prospect, then Thorngate
  - Lloyd Playford Welbourn (October 1871 – )
  - William Bloom Welbourn (25 July 1873 – 18 July 1928) died at Alice Springs
  - Violet May Welbourn (11 May 1877 – ) married Joseph King on 14 July 1896, moved to Georgetown, South Australia
- Catherine Hannah Welbourne (20 June 1840 – 11 May 1934) married her cousin Edward Playford (1841 – 11 June 1900) on 22 November 1868. Their seven children are listed above.

Hannah Welbourn's brother-in-law William Welbourn (c. 1825 – 9 September 1881) married Elizabeth Scivier (c. 1831 – 7 March 1913) and lived at George Street, Norwood. Their children include:

- William Scivier Welbourn (c. 1859 – 26 August 1915) married Esther Rutter ( – 5 May 1922) on 18 March 1884, lived Semaphore
- Edward Welbourn (c. 1864 – 24 March 1942) married Amie Frost (26 May 1867 – 14 March 1943) on 18 April 1888, lived Norwood. She was daughter of German-born Henry Adolph Frost (of Holden & Frost). They had children Cyril, Hilda, and Winnie.
- Elizabeth Scivier Welbourn (c. 1862 – 7 October 1945) married William David Henry Wagstaff (1860–1920) on 13 June 1888, lived Ballville Street, Prospect
- Catherine Marie Welbourn (c. 1868 – 6 August 1951) married Thomas Henry Wall (c. 1865 – 30 March 1946) on 30 December 1891, lived Balfour Street, Prospect
- Alice Welbourn ( – 27 April 1909) married H. Gregory, lived in Fremantle.
