= Willunga =

Willunga may refer to:

- Willunga, South Australia, a locality
- Willunga Football Club, an Australian rules football club in South Australia
- Willunga High School, a high school in South Australia
- Willunga railway line, a former railway line in South Australia
- Willunga railway station, a former railway station in South Australia
- District Council of Willunga, a former local government area in South Australia
- Hundred of Willunga, a cadastral unit in South Australia

== See also ==
- Port Willunga, South Australia
- Willunga South, South Australia
- Willungacetus
