= George McEwin (lawyer) =

George McEwin (1873 – 5 August 1945) was a lawyer and philanthropist in Adelaide, South Australia. He was a grandson of George McEwin, gardener, orchardist, and maker of Glen Ewin jams.

== History ==
McEwin was born in Hindmarsh, South Australia where his father, Rev. John McEwin (1845–1894) was pastor of the local Congregational Church. He was educated at Whinham College, graduating top of the State in 1889, and worked for the AMP Society for four years. He then became articled to James Henderson, qualified in law at the University of Adelaide, and was called to the South Australian Bar in 1899. He worked as a clerk for Murray, Hayward and Magarey before branching out to work for himself, with offices in Grenfell Street.

In October 1908 he joined Patrick McMahon Glynn, KC. and Sir Angas Parsons in partnership, subsequently joined by (later Sir) Mellis Napier.

In March 1920 Glynn, Parsons, McEwin & Napier amalgamated with Baker & Barlow to become Baker, Glynn, Parsons & Co.

In March 1924 G. C Ligertwood left Bennett, Campbell, & Ligertwood to join Baker, Glynn, & McEwin. The partnership Baker, McEwin, Ligertwood & Millhouse 1925–1945, dissolved after death of senior partner John Richard Baker (1866–1944).

Among Mr. McEwin's articled clerks were many who subsequently gained distinction at the Bar. The first was the (later) Crown Solicitor A. J. Hannan KC.

== Other interests ==
- During the First World War McEwin was a worker with the Cheer-Up Society and many other patriotic causes and organizations formed for the benefit of the soldiers in the trenches.
- He was 14 years councillor and alderman with the Adelaide City Council, and made it his business to see the City more amenable to inhabitants and visitors. He was the city's delegate to the Metropolitan and Export Abattoirs Board.
- Consequent on his Council experience, he became an enthusiast for tree planting, a charter member of the SA Forest League, and for many years its president, then SA president when the League went national. He was an enthusiast for Pinus insignis (now Pinus radiata) as championed by Walter Gill.
- He was a strong advocate for the Mount Bold reservoir project, and argued for the construction of a Mannum–Adelaide pipeline.
- He was a regular churchgoer and an adherent of the Congregational Church and for many years member of the Parkin Trust, and its president 1930–1944.
- He was actively connected with the North Adelaide Football and Cricket clubs.
- He was an active member of the Adelaide Caledonian Club and served as Chief 1914–1917.

== Recognition ==
- McEwin received an Order of Merit from the R.S.S.I.L.A, an uncommon honour.

== Family ==
George McEwin (1873–1945) married Evelyn Jones (1876 – 11 February 1949) on 28 April 1906. They had one son:

- John Neil McEwin (1907–1993) married Mary Helen Butler (1909–1993) in 1931. Mary was a daughter of Richard Layton Butler.
