= Eustace Reveley Mitford =

Australian satirist (1810–1869)

Eustace Reveley Mitford (16 November 1810 – 24 October 1869) was a satirical writer, best known as "Pasquin", prominent in the early days of the Colony of South Australia.

== History ==
Mitford was born at St Pancras, London, the third of four sons of barrister John Mitford (1772–1851) of the celebrated Mitford family, and his wife Sarah Mitford née Woodward (1784–1836); his grandparents were the historian William Mitford (1743–1827) and his first wife Frances "Fanny" Mitford née Molloy ( –1776).

He joined the Royal Navy at an early age, and before long transferred to the Spanish service, and may have subsequently served in the British Army, but no details are available; it seems Mitford though voluble about much else, was reticent about his personal history.

Mitford and his small family emigrated to South Australia, arriving aboard Katherine Stewart Forbes (Capt. Alfred Fell) in March 1839 after a long voyage of around 150 days. South Australia's future first Chief Justice, Charles Cooper, was a fellow passenger.

Mitford purchased a farming property of 80 acres (32 ha) Section 114, Marion Road near the site of the present Ascot Park school. John Crozier's "Oaklands" selection was nearby, as was Section 115 of Dr Handasyde Duncan, a fellow passenger on the Katherine Stewart Forbes. Sections 114 and 115 now comprise the suburb of Park Holme. Despite augmenting his farm income by driving a bullock team between Port Adelaide and Burra, the farming venture was not a success, and after fifteen years' toil he sold up and moved to a house on South Road, Edwardstown.

He tried his hand as a miner, which turned out to be a mistake. The Tiparra and Bald Hills survey prospects in which he invested proved worthless. He claimed to have been cheated of his rights to the Moonta copper discoveries.

He had been, under the pen name of "Pasquin", publishing forthright letters to the Telegraph advocating freedom of communication and removal of Government controls on business, and had built up a following, impressed with his liberal views and idiosyncratic writing. On 26 January 1867 the first issue of his Pasquin: Pastoral, Mineral & Agricultural Advocate appeared, price 4d. (four pence, perhaps $10 in today's values) or by subscription at 4s. (four shillings) per quarter, published by Mitford and Henry Hutchings. Mitford served as editor, lead writer and caricaturist. His vigorous, infuriating, cantankerous and aggressive but entertaining prose achieved immediate recognition and a degree of financial success.

"A new weekly newspaper is to be published in Adelaide on and after tomorrow morrow, the editorship of Pasquin, whose clever satirical writings in the Telegraph were very popular." — Kapunda Herald 25 January 1867
"Pasquin is an amusing fellow, but his writing is only likely to be relished by the intellectual portion of the community, and we rather fear he will not find his literary bantling (Note: bantling : derogatory term for a young boy; a brat, bastard) a paying speculation." — Wallaroo Times 30 January 1867
"Whether people will care to pay for it at the rate of fourpence for eight quarto pages Pasquin will of course soon find out." — Southern Argus 2 February 1867

In June 1867 his printer, Samuel E. Roberts of King William Street, took over the business side of the paper, leaving Mitford free to concentrate on content. It was short-lived however, as two years later while suffering from a cold, Mitford suffered a sudden relapse and died. The paper did not long outlive him; its last issue was published on the last day of 1870.

We regret to see the announcement in the daily papers that this weekly journal of fun ceased to exist on the 31st ultimo. Those who remember the way in which the paper originated, and the rare genius and talent with which it had been conducted, will share with us the sorrow we express at its extinction. It was felt from the time of the lamented decease of the late Eustace Revely [sic] Mitford, that it would be difficult to find any gentleman capable of worthily taking up his pen, and although many able men have since then contributed to its columns, the want which Mitford created has not been met since his death. Unsparing in his merciless vivisection of all that was dishonest, hypocritical, and unjust, there was an originality and raciness of humour in his writings which, in its way, has not been surpassed since the days of Rabelais. But all things pass away; Mitford has gone, and Pasquin follows. The telegrams from Arabia will be recorded no more in the sheets of Adelaide. The Arab's tent has been struck for ever, and there are but few (and those only of the class who most deserved his castigation) who will not think that a Mitford was a personal loss to many; the death of Pasquin will be felt as an equal loss to the young literature of South Australia.

Mitford was buried in the churchyard of St Mary's on the Sturt, the Anglican church he helped to found, in what is now the Adelaide suburb of St Marys.

== Family ==
Eustace Reveley Mitford (1811 – 24 October 1869) married Eliza Sanders (c. 1815 – 24 June 1893). Their children included:

- Bertram Eustace Mitford ( – 25 January 1916). Died at Nuriootpa. Not the prolific author.
- Bertha Mitford (1837 – 15 April 1920) married John Reid (c. 1830 – 23 October 1916) in 1860
- Eustace Reveley Mitford (1839 – 25 March 1898) married Catherine Maxwell Jaffrey (c. 1844 – 4 March 1922) on 2 December 1876

- Katherine Frances Mitford (1879 – 12 August 1941) married Frederick Marshall Stuart (c. 1870 – 22 September 1952) in 1899

- Percy Benson Mitford (23 March 1842 – 25 November 1891) married Mary Elizabeth Carter in 1880. He was a publican, died in North Queensland
- Flora McDonald Mitford (1844 – 16 November 1910) postmistress at Nuriootpa, nursed invalid brother Bertram E. Mitford
- Alice Mitford (1845 – 21 May 1937) married W(illiam) Watson Gall jr. (c. 1829 – 22 May 1884) on 7 January 1869. last surviving daughter
- Henry Edward Mitford (30 June 1847 – 17 January 1924) married Charlotte Jaffrey ( – 1919) on 30 April 1877

- Alexander Mitford (1878 – 1964)
- Bertram Edward Mitford (1880 – 25 August 1931) died by self-inflicted gunshot
- Harry Edward Mitford (1883 – ) married Mabel Beatrice/Beatrice Mabel Gum ( – ) on 17 September 1913

- Frances Emma Mitford (c. 1849 – 21 December 1863)
- Adrian Reveley Mitford (1850 – 23 April 1933) died in Queensland
- Charles Reveley Mitford (4 March 1854 – 28 May 1937) married Elizabeth McSporran ( – 14 September 1953) in 1897, lived at Port Augusta

Eliza's sister Charlotte Sanders died at Nuriootpa 31 May 1899.
