= John Stephens (editor) =

English writer and polemicist

John Stephens (30 September 1806 – 28 November 1850) was a writer, polemicist and editor in England who became an editor and newspaper owner in the early days of South Australia.

== Early life ==
Stephens was born in North Shields, Northumberland, the seventh child of Rev. John Stephens (1772–1841), a Wesleyan Methodist, and brother of Edward and Samuel, both to achieve prominence in South Australia. Other brothers remained in Europe and achieved notability in their own way: James was 'J. R. Stephens' – a Wesleyan minister imprisoned for 18 months on charges of sedition and unlawful assembly as a result of his association with the Chartist movement; George was a noted philologist, and for many years Professor of English Literature at Copenhagen University .

Stephens was educated in Leeds at Woodhouse Grove Academy (a boarding school for the sons of Methodist ministers) and subsequently at Leeds Grammar School, but he failed to display any great academic aptitude.

== Career in England ==
After a period assisting the Rev. Thomas Blanshard in the Book-Room of the Wesleyan Methodists, he set up as a bookseller and publisher at 16 City Road, London, (Note: Blanshard died in 1824 'late superintendent at the Book-Room of the Wesleyan Methodist Society ' (age not given); in 1822 an advertisement gave his London address as 14 City Road) publishing from January 1830 onwards the Christian Advocate, aiming to report the proceedings of all Christian societies, bestowing particular attention to "facts which relate more immediately to the interests of Wesleyan Methodism".

An irreparable breach with the Old Connection Wesleyan Methodist Conference occurred after Lord Sandon, the Earl of Harrowby, became Member of Parliament for Liverpool with the support of Jabez Bunting, a prominent Methodist. Since Methodism deprecated political activity in general, but was strongly abolitionist, Bunting's support of a candidate not committed to abolition was strongly criticised by Liverpudlian Methodists. The Conference objected to the Christian Advocate airing this criticism and withdrew all co-operation. Matters worsened when the Christian Advocate campaigned for disestablishment of the Church of England, a policy opposed by the Wesleyan Conference; the ramifications of this included the resignation of Stephens' brother Joseph from the Wesleyan Ministry. The Advocate ceased publication in 1840, merging with the Champion, but Stephens remained active as a publisher; presumably with radical sympathies – The Book of the Bastilles was published in 1841 by "J Stephens, Warwick-Lane, London".

Stephens was impressed with Wakefield's proposals for the colonisation of South Australia, which he eulogised in his Land of Promise, followed by An Exposure of the absurd, unfounded, and contradictory Statements in James's Six Months in Australia, a response to criticisms by T. Horton James in his 1838 book Six Months in South Australia (the second edition of Land of Promise included the rebuttal of James and had the more neutral title History of South Australia but: 'Mr Stephens writes not so much as a historian of South Australia as its encomiast'). He edited the short-lived South Australian Colonist for George Fife Angas and the South Australian News, a monthly first published in 1841.

While running his bookshop, he married Sophia, the only daughter of William Fleming of the Methodist Missionary Committee, and had one daughter. His wife died in 1836 and he remarried (Fidelia Jenkins) (Note: 'eldest daughter of the late Lieut. William Jenkins RN': probably not really a Fidelia – the eldest recorded daughter of William and Mary Jenkins was baptised Mary in March 1816) a few years later (1839).

== Career in South Australia ==
Following the emigration of his brothers to South Australia, he, his daughter and his wife followed on the Arab, arriving on 23 January 1843; he commenced working as editor of the South Australian Register almost immediately. In July 1843 he founded The Adelaide Observer and acquired the South Australian Register in June 1845.

Stephens gave public lectures on comets (on the occasion of the Great Comet of 1843), Total Abstinence and hydropathy treatment, and "sanatory reform"

He was a champion of free press, small business, and good writing, and although a teetotaller, was broadminded and generous in his views. His newspaper was vigorous in exposing hypocrisy and injustices.

In 1848 his presses were seized for debt and a rival obligingly printed two issues.

His eldest daughter died on 31 March 1850. His health deteriorated, perhaps under the strain of libel actions and criticisms from people of influence. A large number of colonists published a letter of support for him in a supplement to The South Australian Register on 7 March 1850.

He died at "Seacombe", the Brighton residence of his brother Edward, manager of the Bank of South Australia, on 28 November 1850.

== Controversies ==
- In April 1843, as joint editor of The Register, he was involved with its owner James Allen in a libel of Southern Australian (later The South Australian) editor Archibald Macdougall. (Allen had previously been editor of Macdougall's South Australian Magazine.) Citing absence from the business due to illness, Allen shifted the onus to Stephens, who was however able to produce a directive from Allen authorising the text complained of. Clearly the relationship was not to last and probably the impetus for Stephens to found The Observer.
- A running feud with bookseller George Charles Eastland Platts started when he took over a lease in Waterloo House, Hindley Street, previously tenanted by Platts, and advertised himself as "successor to Charles Platts". Platts accused Stephens of deceptive conduct and Stephens stated he had been offered the lease by F. Bayne, the owner's agent, so had not acted in bad faith. This became the new print shop and office for The Observer and The Adelaide Register. Platts had a kind of revenge by not forwarding to Stephens a number of bales of Indian newspapers incorrectly addressed to one of Platts' shops on Hindley Street.
- Dr Ferdinand Von Sommer was one of many who felt the lash of Stephens's editorials and sought redress in the libel laws. He had been staying at Charles Colton's Royal Admiral Hotel and attempted to procure Colton's daughter Sarah for the night. Nothing of the sort transpired, but Colton was furious at the unprofessional conduct of someone he considered his friend as well as his medical adviser, and mentioned the fact to Stephens. The jury found for Von Sommer, and the "lustful and dirty minded Doctor", as Stephens had called him, was awarded damages of one farthing.
- George Stevenson, editor of the South Australian Gazette and Colonial Register sued Stephens for libel after the South Australian Register accused "honest George Stevenson" of dishonesty while exercising his power of attorney at the Glen Osmond Mines during the absence the proprietor, Lewis William Gilles, brother of Osmond Gilles. Again, the jury found for the plaintiff and awarded damages of £20.
- One Michael Cook, a saddler, after being charged with rape of his servant girl, was roundly attacked in the pages of the Register. When the charge was dismissed, partly on the basis of the girl's previous consent and her being twelve years of age (that being in 1847 the age of consent), the South Australian took the side of the saddler, accusing Stephens of ruining Cook's good name. Stephens demanded a retraction, and when one was not forthcoming, sued the editor Andrew Murray. In December 1848 a public meeting was held at the Old Queen's Theatre supporting Stephens and the Freedom of the Press. Speakers included Daniel Fisher.
- Captain Ellis sued Stephens for libel after a letter was published in the Register critical of Ellis's sacking without pay of an employee Macguillan who had used his employer's horse. The jury found for Ellis and awarded damages of one farthing.
- He published a story which the Leworthy family felt libelled: the story concerned a "Windworth" family which emigrated on the ship Jonathan and engaged in reprehensible behaviour. The Leworthys had emigrated on the John Munn. The parallels between the "fiction" and their own circumstances were too numerous to be mere coincidence.
- In an obituary for businessman Samuel Stocks jun., he was rather frank in describing how the deceased had fallen into intemperate habits and ruined his own health after making a fortune from the Burra Burra mines. A petition calling for Stephens' sacking gathered some 150 signatures. Significantly, Stocks sen. took the side of Stephens.
- John Lazar, manager of the New Queen's Theatre, sued Stephens for libel after he published, on 16 January 1850, a critique of an actor's performance in the play "Susan Hopley", objecting to the actor's use of lewd gestures and indecent language intended to be humorous. Again the libel was found proved and again damages of one farthing were awarded.

In most of these proceedings, Stephens was represented by barristers George Milner Stephen and Richard Davies Hanson, both of whom had illustrious later careers.

In 1850 a number of influential people signed a petition calling for prosecution of Stephens and closing of his newspapers. A declaration of support was published in the Register and appended to in successive issues. A public meeting held at Mount Barker, chaired by John Dunn showed popular support among farmers for his independence and opposition to taxation without representation.

== A tribute ==
LINES OCCASIONED BY THE DEATH OF THE LATE JOHN STEPHENS, ESQ.

The master-mind that so long shed
A lustre on our varied page
Has from the mental warfare fled,
And closed his earthly pilgrimage.

But his was no inglorious flight –
It was the behest of his Lord, [pronounced BE-hest]
He battled to the last for right,
And now enjoys his great reward.

Fresh tears may from affliction's eye
Grateful, upon his grave, descend;
And virtue o'er his tomb may sigh,
Who was, through life, their firmest friend

For none like him could plead so well
The miseries of the distressed:
And none like him e'er sought to tell
Abroad the wrongs of the oppressed.

And none could more sincerely seek
To serve his fellow-men than he,
Who fostered virtue, maiden meek,
And worshipped "stern integrity."

What though, from his indignant mind,
At times expressions overlong
Were wrung – his motive still was kind,
And love of right then drove him wrong.

No more shall he, with fervid pen.
In freedom's cause pour forth his soul,
And kindle in the hearts of men
A fire no despot could control.

Be it our task still to pursue
The honest onward path he trod.
To his great motto ever true,
"The Rights of Man, the Love of God."

NOTE.-It will be observed that these lines are from the pen of a gentleman attached to the literary staff of the SOUTH AUSTRALIAN REGISTER. They cannot be published in that journal in consequence of the expressed wish of the deceased that no notice of his death should appear beyond the usual obituary paragraph. We have much pleasure, at the writer's request, in inserting them in our columns.

== Family ==
He had two brothers who arrived in South Australia on 27 July 1836 on the Duke of York: banker Edward Stephens (1811–1861) who survived him and Samuel (1808–1840), who was the first Colonial Manager and died in a horse-riding accident.

He married Miss Fleming, a fellow Methodist, who died in 1836. Sophie (ca. April 1832 (Note: a Sophia, father John, mother Sophia, was baptised Shoreditch January 1833; in the 1841 census, an 8-yr-old Sophia and a 35-year-old John (journeyman printer) are living on St Andrew's Hill, with a 25-year-old Levina Stephens who is presumably (certainly the right age to be) 'Fidelia'/Mary) – 31 March 1850), daughter by his first wife, died of scarlet fever

He married again, to Fidelia Jenkins in 1839 (Note: It is likely that Charles Jenkins (ca.1824 – 13 July 1868) of Cowandilla, who acted as clerk and debt collector for Stephens, was her brother Charles, born to William and Mary Jenkins November 1820 and baptised (Wesleyan Methodist) at Devonport April 1821 Jenkins married Elizabeth Barton on 28 January 1851 and had daughter Marianne Fidelia. He later became an auctioneer, a partner with W. Harrold and died insolvent.) Fidelia died 8 November 1891. Three children died in infancy (one on board the Arab).

- Charles (1842 – 30 December 1877) married Frances Marian Hawson (ca.1845 – 20 August 1928) on 12 January 1870; their children included Albert Edward, Ernest Hubert, Marian Fidelia (18 October 1872 – 12 October 1905) and Lilian.
- Emma (9 July 1847 – 9 July 1918) married Charles James Penny (1843 – 24 December 1919)

- Harold John Penny MB BS, resident medical officer at Adelaide Hospital was a son

== Bibliography ==
- The Land of Promise republished as The History of the Rise and Progress of the New British Province of South Australia (1839)
- South Australia – an EXPOSURE of the Absurd, Unfounded and Contradictory Statements in James's "Six Months in South Australia" (1839) A forensic critique of a book by T. Horton James Esq., personally endorsed by Captains John F. Duff (Africaine), William Chesser (Coromandel) and John W. Hurst (Lady Emma). This book is free to read as an eBook
- The Royal South Australian Almanack and General Directory (1846)
- A Voice from South Australia (1847)
- The Adelaide Miscellany of Useful and Entertaining Knowledge (1848)
- Sanitary reform : its general aspect and local importance considered in a lecture delivered at the new Queen's Theatre, Adelaide, on Tuesday evening, 13 February 1849, together with practical observations on South Australia, applicable to the subject as affecting the sanitary condition of the colony (1849) Facsimile reprint (64pp.) by Libraries Board of South Australia, Adelaide 1962
- Lecture on Comets (1849)
