= James Allen (newspaperman) =

English-born writer and newspaper owner

- Born: 1806; Birmingham, England
- Died: 21 March 1886 (aged 79–80); Melbourne, Victoria, Australia
- Other name: "Dismal Jemmy"
- Occupations: writer, journalist, newspaper owner

James Allen (1806 – 21 March 1886), nicknamed "Dismal Jemmy", was an English-born writer, journalist and newspaper owner in Australia and New Zealand.

== Biography ==
Allen was born in Birmingham and educated at Horton College. He was for some time a reporter on the London Morning Post, and was an associate of Charles Dickens.

He emigrated to Adelaide, South Australia, arriving in Adelaide in 1839, and shortly after became editor of The Southern Australian. In December 1841 he published the first South Australian News-letter, a compendium of statistics on the new colony, for new immigrants to send "home" to Britain. In 1842 he purchased for £600 the South Australian Register from George Stevenson, who was withdrawing from journalism, and sold it to John Stephens. In 1845 he returned to England.

In 1848 Allen was back in Adelaide and, with John Brown and William Barlow Gilbert, founded The Adelaide Times, modelled on The Times of London, and was its editor until it folded, the last issue appearing on 8 May 1858. A notable reporter and sub-editor in the paper was W. M. Akhurst.

He then went to Melbourne, where he edited the Melbourne Herald and started the Mail, the first penny evening paper issued in that city.

In 1865 Allen moved to Hobart, Tasmania, and edited the Hobart Mercury, afterwards starting the Evening Mail. He then went to New Zealand, and conducted the Auckland Evening News until 1870, when he returned to Victoria and purchased The Camperdown Chronicle, of which he remained owner till 1880. Allen published a "History of Australia" in 1882, before dying in Melbourne in 1886, then reckoned to be Australia's oldest journalist.

== Sources ==
- "The Early Printers of Melbourne" in The Australasian Typographical Journal, May, 1898.
