= The Observer (Adelaide) =

Newspaper published in Adelaide, Australia

The Observer, previously The Adelaide Observer, was a Saturday newspaper published in Adelaide, South Australia from July 1843 to February 1931. Virtually every issue of the newspaper (under both titles) has been digitised and is available online through the National Library of Australia's Trove archive service.

== History ==
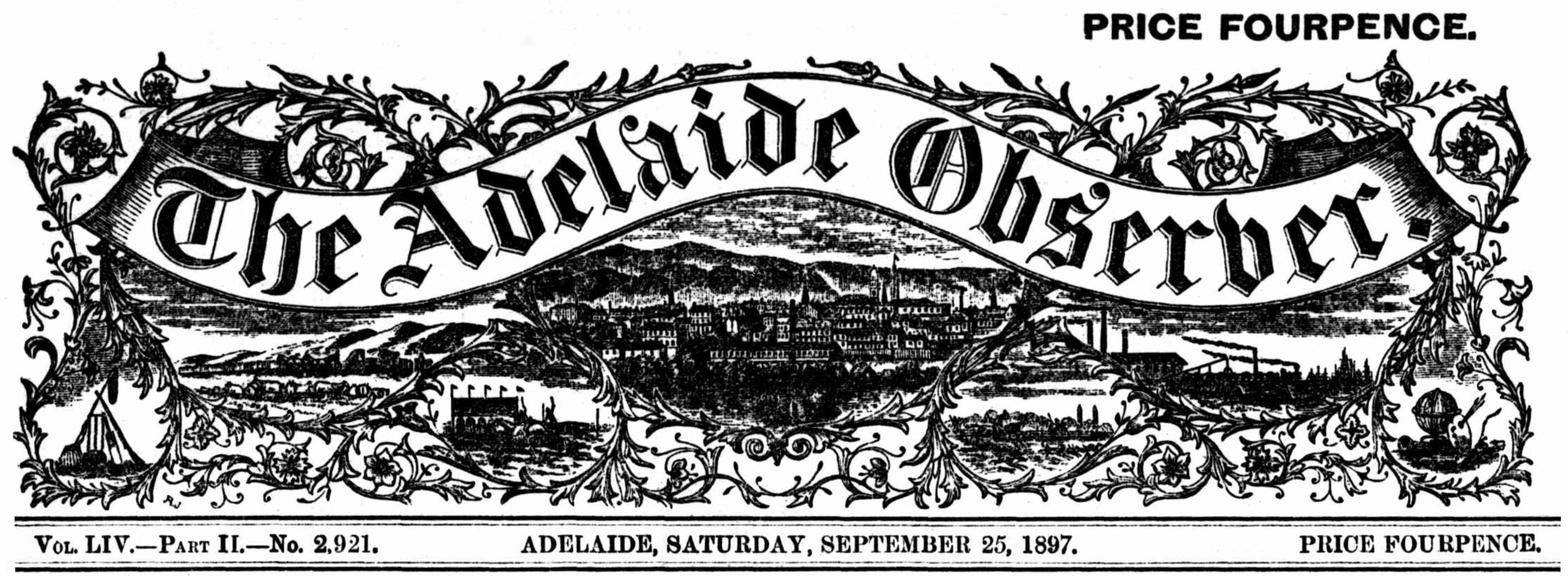
The Adelaide Observer masthead in 1897

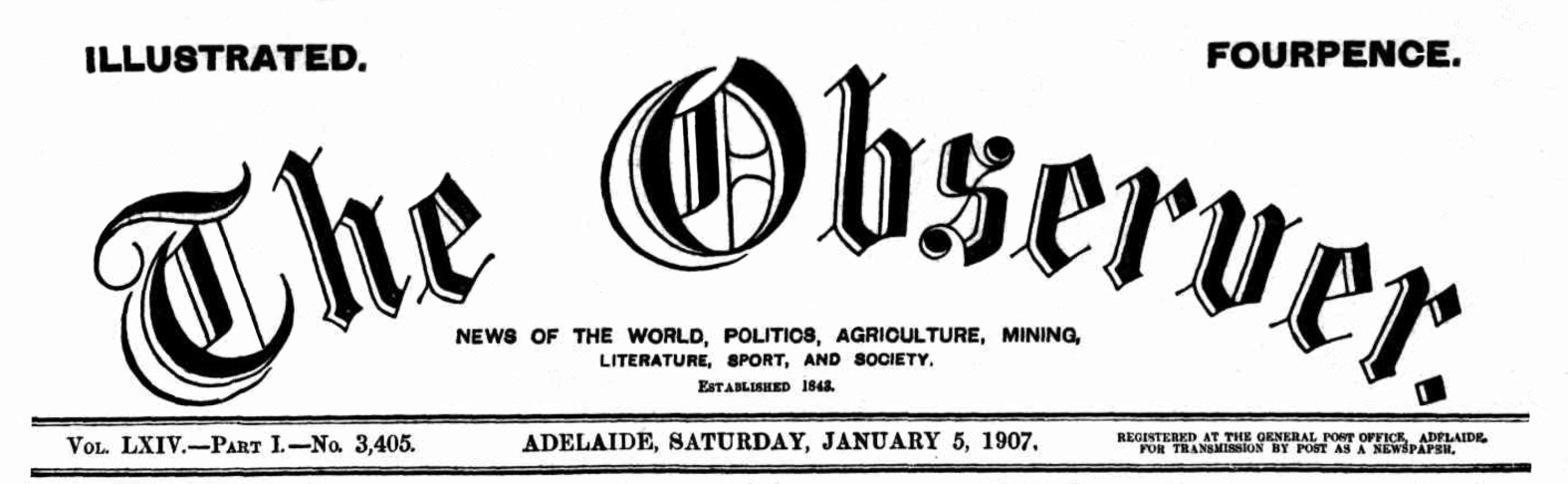
The masthead after the paper was renamed

=== The Adelaide Observer ===
The newspaper was founded on 1 July 1843 by John Stephens, its sole proprietor, as a replacement for George Dehane's Examiner, which ran from 25 November 1841 to 24 June 1843. Both were printed by Dehane at his establishment on Morphett Street adjacent Trinity Church.

In 1845, Stephens purchased another local newspaper, the South Australian Register.

=== The Observer ===
On 7 January 1905, the newspaper was renamed The Observer, whose masthead later proclaimed "The Observer. News of the world, politics, agriculture, mining, literature, sport and society. Established 1843". In February 1931, the ailing Depression-hit newspaper, along with The Register and other sister publications, was taken over by The Advertiser and shut down.
