= George Stevenson (editor) =

South Australian journalist

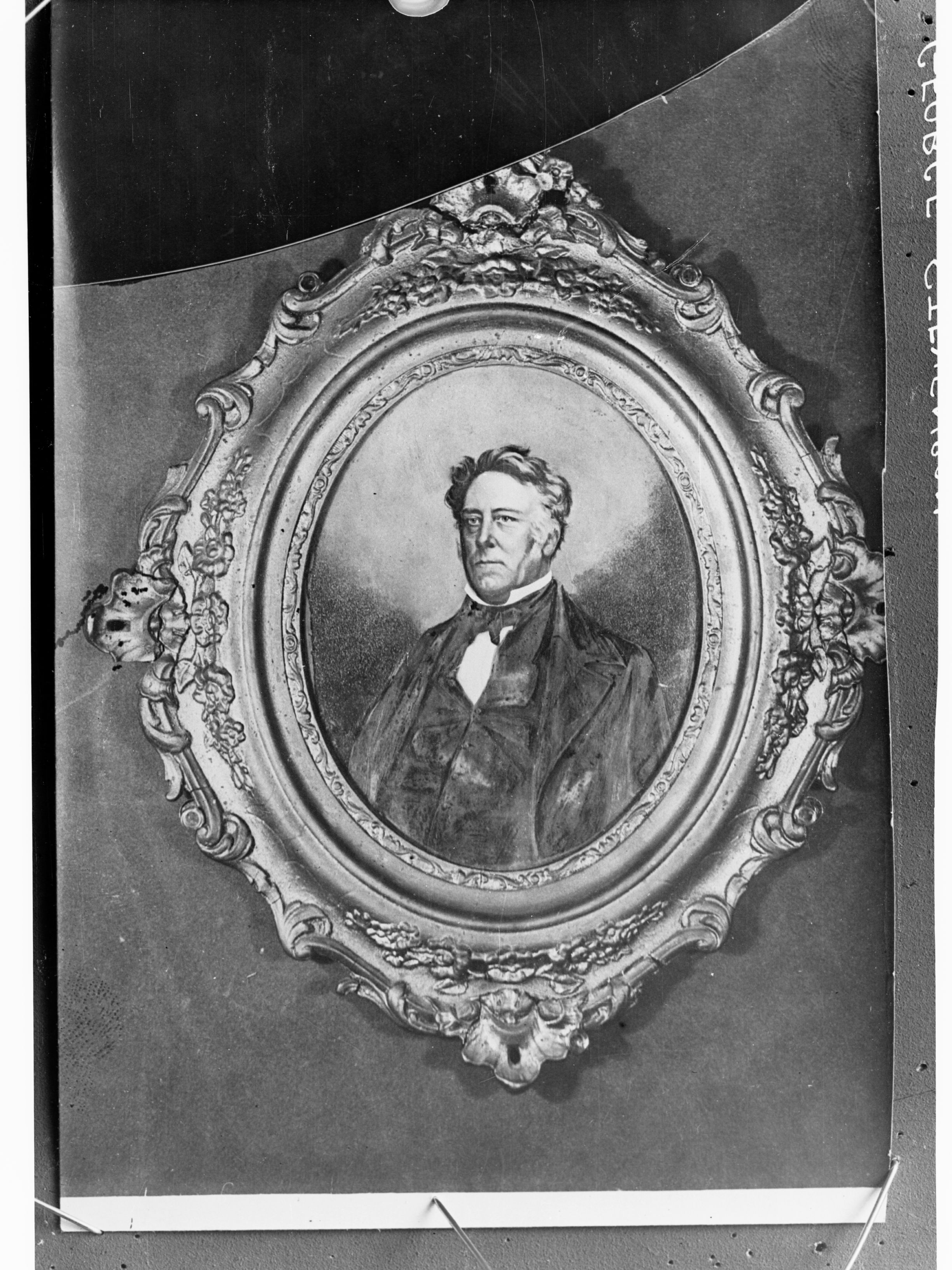
George Stevenson, First editor and part proprietor of the South Australian Gazette, ca. 1915

George Stevenson (13 April 1799 – 19 October 1856) was a pioneer South Australian newspaper editor and horticulturist. He came to Adelaide as private secretary to the first Governor of South Australia, John Hindmarsh.

Stevenson married Margaret Gorton, of Chester, on 12 May 1836 at St George's, Hanover Square, London.

== Horticulture ==
With his gardener, George McEwin (1815–1885), Stevenson supplied most of the colony with vine cuttings, and set up a nursery for fruit trees.

McEwin was the author of the South Australian Vigneron and Gardeners' Manual: containing plain practical directions for the cultivation of the vine; the propagation of fruit-trees, with catalogue and directions for cultivation; and the management of the kitchen garden, with catalogue of culinary vegetables, &c. &c, and later founded "Glen Ewin" orchard

Stevenson has been dubbed the "Father of Horticulture in South Australia". He was, with John Barton Hack, one of the two first winegrowers in South Australia. Both Stevenson and Hack planted their first grapes at North Adelaide in 1837: Stevenson at "Melbourne Cottage" on his block between Melbourne Street and Finniss Street; Hack on his "Chichester Gardens" between Melbourne Street and Stanley Street. These properties were cut up for housing three or four years later.

Stevenson then rented the "Old Botanic Garden" (on the River Torrens below McKinnon Parade, North Adelaide) 1842–1843. This area was later rented by William Haines then George Francis, who pressed for a properly constituted Botanic Gardens.

== Legacy ==
Stevenson died at his home, Lytton Lodge, in Finniss Street, North Adelaide on 18 October 1856, and was survived by a daughter and two sons, one being George J. W. Stevenson (1839–1893), politician and journalist. His daughter Margaret Jane Stevenson (1844–1918) married Ernest Maudslay de Mole in 1868; their daughter Violet de Mole (1874–1946) was a noted teacher of French.
