= South Australian Register =

Oldest daily newspaper in South Australia

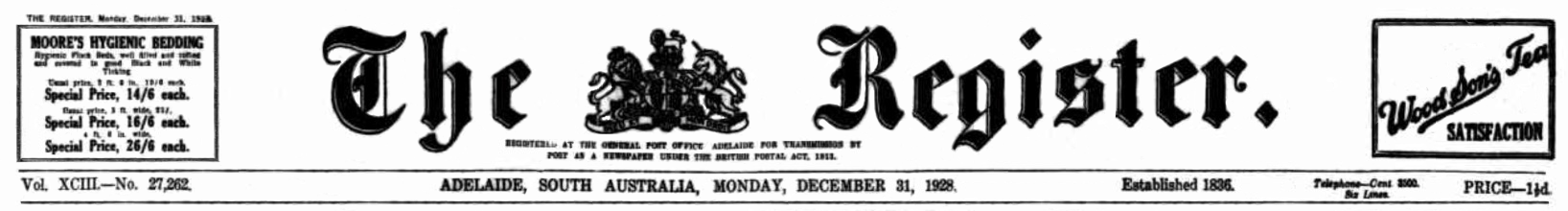
The paper's masthead on 31 December 1928

The Register, originally the South Australian Gazette and Colonial Register, and later South Australian Register, was South Australia's first newspaper. It was first published in London in June 1836, moved to Adelaide in 1837, and folded into The Advertiser almost a century later in February 1931.

The newspaper was the sole primary source for almost all information about the settlement and early history of South Australia. It documented shipping schedules, legal history and court records at a time when official records were not kept. According to the National Library of Australia, its pages contain "one hundred years of births, deaths, marriages, crime, building history, the establishment of towns and businesses, political and social comment".

All issues are freely available online, via Trove.

== History ==
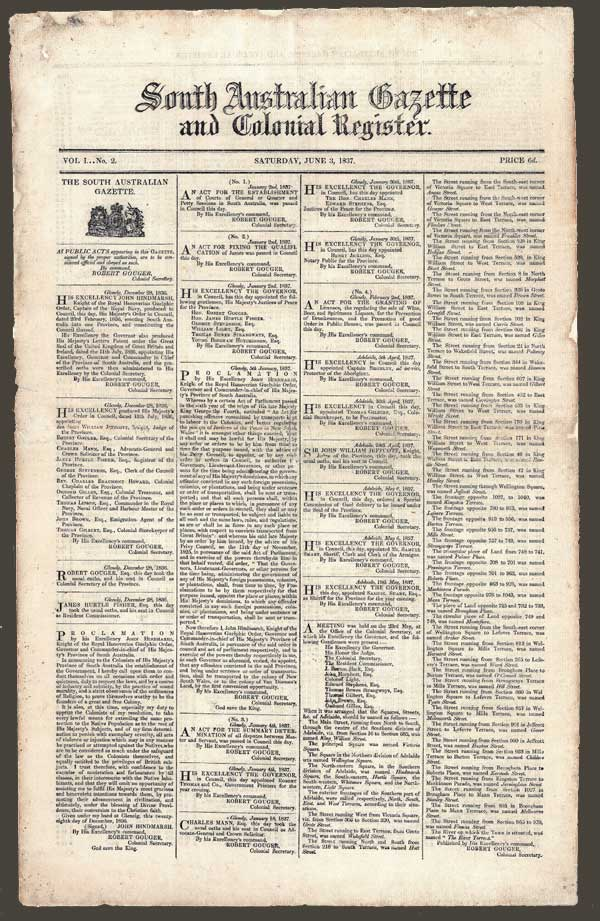
Front page of Vol 1, No 2 (3 June 1837) of the South Australian Gazette and Colonial Register

The Register was conceived by Robert Thomas, a law stationer, who had purchased for his family 134 acres (54 ha) of land in the proposed South Australian province after being impressed by the ideas of Edward Gibbon Wakefield. The first issue (printed by William Clowes & Sons, Duke-street, Stamford-street, Lambeth, London), appeared in London on 18 June 1836 with his friend and partner, George Stevenson, as editor. Thomas embarked for South Australia aboard the Africaine later that year, arriving on 10 November 1836 with his family and equipment to set up a printing plant. It was six months before the first colonial edition of The Register was printed on 3 June 1837 in a small mud hut on Town Acre No. 56 in Hindley Street, near what is now named Register Place. (The colloquialism "mud hut" would seem to be an understatement for a substantial pisé building in which was operated a demy Stanhope press, an ancient wooden press, and racks holding "half a ton of bourgeois and brevier type, a good fount of small pica for printing official documents, and a quantity of general jobbing type" with all the other requirements for editing, setting up, printing and distributing an admittedly small circulation newspaper.)

From the start, the paper asserted a strongly independent stance. Stevenson's style was vigorous and provocative, making himself and The Register several enemies. His opposition to Colonel William Light's choice of site for the new capital and J. H. Fisher as Resident Commissioner, led them and others to found the Southern Australian in direct competition with The Register. The paper's antagonism of Governor Gawler led to The Register losing government business notably the South Australian Government Gazette. The printers Thomas & Co. had disengaged themselves from editorial content in June 1839 in a vain attempt to protect their monopoly and lost about £1,650 a year. His protest that he was authorised by the British Government to do its printing failed and, insolvent, he sold the paper for £600 to James Allen (previously editor of the South Australian Magazine) in 1842, as Stevenson withdrew from journalism.

Thomas also published the weekly Adelaide Chronicle and South Australian Literary Record (10 December 1839 – 18 May 1842).

John Stephens, who had in 1843 founded The Adelaide Observer, in 1845 purchased The Register. Anthony Forster became part owner in 1848; With the death of Stephens in 1850, his share was taken over by John Taylor. Forster's share was taken over by Joseph Fisher in 1853, then sold to John Howard Clark in 1865.

The paper, having been printed sporadically previously, became weekly in June 1838 and later twice-weekly from February 1843. By 1840, The Register employed a staff of 21. These were an editor, three pressmen, ten compositors, two binders, a collector, a clerk, delivery man and two boys. One of its compositors also acted as sub-editor. Its circulation by 1840 was 900.

On 1 January 1850, it became a daily publication, and three years later the paper was bought back by Thomas's son William Kyffin Thomas as part of South Australia's first media syndicate with Anthony Forster, Edward William Andrews and Joseph Fisher. They also purchased its weekly sister publication, The Adelaide Observer, and established The Evening Journal (January 1869 – September 1912) which morphed into The Journal (October 1912 – July 1923) which then became The News. Its Saturday edition was called The Saturday Journal (July 1923 – April 1929).

The Register outlasted many competitors throughout its long history, holding a monopoly on the market at various stages, but it ultimately met its match in The Advertiser. The Advertiser, founded in 1858, first emerged as a serious challenger to the paper in the 1870s. The defining move which swung Adelaide readership from the conservative Register to the more egalitarian Advertiser was the latter's dramatic price reduction from 2d. to 1d., and hiring an army of canvassers, on commission, to peddle the paper. The Register was slow to respond, the Advertiser started putting its circulation figures on the masthead. By the time the Register cut its price the die was cast. The Advertiser bought out The Register and closed it down in February 1931 after the Great Depression had severely reduced its fortunes, forcing it to become largely pictorial.

== Chronology ==
Significant events in the newspaper's history are as follows:

Year	Event
1836	Volume 1, issue 1 was printed in London by Clowes and Sons for Robert Thomas and George Stevenson on 18 June. The proclamation of government in South Australia was printed for the governor on 30 December – the first printing job in the new province.
1837	The press was moved to Acre 56, 37 Hindley Street (just west of Morphett Street) on 1 June. The South Australian Gazette and Colonial Register volume 1, issue 2 is published on 3 June 1837. Although subscribers were promised weekly publication, subsequent issues were published on 8 July, 29 July, 12 August, 16 September, 4 October, 19 October and 11 November. Price: 6 pence per issue.
1838?	Robert Thomas's son, William Kyffin Thomas, began work for the paper, aged 16.
1839	The South Australian Government rescinded Robert Thomas's right to publish The South Australian Government Gazette on 15 June. The paper was renamed The South Australian Register. Price was raised to 1 shilling (12 pence) per issue.
1840	Thomas and Stevenson purchased the copyright and equipment of The Adelaide Chronicle from William Caddy Cox. The newly incorporated newspaper, The Chronicle, edited by James Frederick Bennett, was published on Wednesdays. The South Australian Register was published on Saturdays. Early in the year, the newspaper was enlarged from 6 pages to 8. On 29 August the page size increased Demy to broadsheet.
1842	The business was purchased by James Allen.
1843	Premises moved to the corner of Rundle and King William Streets – the "Beehive Corner". Publication increased to twice weekly.
1845	The Register was purchased in June by John Stephens, who several years previously had acted as editor for some months. Concurrently Stephens's own newspaper, The Adelaide Observer, a weekly directed at regional South Australia, was published. Richard D. Hanson was his lawyer and occasional contributor. The paper moved to larger premises in Hindley Street.
1848	Anthony Forster became part-owner, but after a few months took no part in its running.
1850	Daily publication began in January. About this time the price was reduced to 4 pence. Stephens died on 28 November; publication was taken over by William Kyffin Thomas.
1851	Charles Day was employed as a junior.
1853	The paper was taken over by a syndicate of seven, which soon reduced to four: Forster, Joseph Fisher, E. W. Andrews and William Kyffin Thomas.
1854	The paper moved from Hindley Street to Grenfell Street and a steam-powered press was installed. Andrew Garran joined as editor; after 2 years he moved to Sydney.
1856?	John Henry Barrow became co-editor about this time; he left in 1858 to become co-founder of The South Australian Advertiser.
1858	William Whitridge Roberts Whitridge succeeded Barrow; he died in 1861.
1860	Robert Thomas died; editorship was taken over by John Taylor. Gas lighting was installed, from their own generator until town gas was available.
1864	Price reduced to 3 pence.
1865	Fisher sold his share to John Howard Clark
1868	Sister newspaper Evening Journal began publication.
1870	Format was changed from broadsheet to 8 pages of smaller size. Price was unchanged at 3 pence.
1877	E. W. Andrews and J. Howard Clark died. Charles Day, John Harvey Finlayson and Robert Kyffin Thomas, who were all involved with its production, were brought in as partners.
1878	William Kyffin Thomas died. Circulation reached 10,000.
1882	Price was reduced to 2 pence.
1890	C. Day retired from the partnership; Robert Kyffin Thomas took his place as commercial manager.
1892	A Knickerbocker printing press was installed. Price was reduced to 1 penny.
1897	William John Sowden, formerly of thePort Adelaide News and Kapunda Herald, became acting editor.
1899	Sowden and Evan Kyffin Thomas joined the partnership. Sowden (later Sir William) was editor from 1899 to 1922.
1900	The newspaper's name was changed from South Australian Register to The Register.
1901	A 3-decker Hoe press was installed
1929	The company was restructured as Register Newspapers Limited, with Evan Kyffin Thomas, C. Kyffin Thomas and Keith Murdoch as directors.
1930	The paper was renamed Register News-Pictorial.
1931	Circulation, which had declined as a result of the Great Depression, was improving but the business was still unprofitable. The last issue was published on 20 February 1931 and the following day the paper was incorporated with The Advertiser as The Advertiser and Register. The last issue under that name was published on 30 September.

== See also ==
- Margaret Stevenson, satirist and columnist for the paper, and wife of George Stevenson
