= F. S. C. Driffield =

Frederick Simeon Carus Driffield (1825 – 18 June 1889) was a businessman in the early days of the colony of South Australia.

== History ==
Frederick Driffield was born at Prescot, Lancashire, the sixth son of the Rev. Charles George Townshend Driffield, Vicar of Prescot. He was a cousin of General Sir Arnold Kemball.

He was educated for the Church, and afterwards qualified to go out to China as a teataster. Instead, he emigrated to South Australia with a younger brother and J. Hamilton Parr in the ship Posthumous, arriving in June 1849. Shortly after their arrival they built the Knowsley flourmill, near Woodside and supported John Baker in his successful 1851 bid for the South Australian Legislative Council seat of Mount Barker. They were brought to financial ruin with the exodus to the Victorian diggings and were compelled to join the rush. Driffield returned to Woodside in 1853 after enjoying some success prospecting at Ovens, Victoria.

- He was appointed Secretary of the Agricultural and Horticultural Society in 1866, which position he held for some nine or ten years.
- In 1866 he founded the highly successful West Adelaide Building Society.
- He was for many years Secretary to the Adelaide branch of Lloyd's of London, which he remodelled as the Adelaide Marine and Fire Assurance Company.
- He was appointed Secretary of the Adelaide Chamber of Commerce.

An employee, John Creswell, took over the business and also succeeded him (though not immediately) as Secretary of both the Chamber of Commerce and the Agricultural Society. Creswell was succeeded in both roles by J. A. Riley; all three capably and for considerable periods.

== Family ==
He married Jane McMinn ( – 28 June 1914) on 22 January 1856; they had one daughter and six sons.
