= George Jeffrey (wool expert) =

George Jeffrey (1853 – 26 April 1942) was a Scots-born wool technologist, who developed the art or science of wool classing in South Australia through teaching and lecturing, leading to better returns to the grower and bolstering the country's reputation for high quality wools.

== History ==
Jeffrey was born in Scotland and served his apprenticeship as a wool sorter at Hawick. He left for Australia and for a time worked in wool scouring and fellmongers' factories, but the work was too strenuous for his constitution and he returned to the trade of wool sorter and buyer in Melbourne.

=== Lobethal ===
In 1880 The insolvent Lobethal Wool and Tweed Company was offered for sale by auction, unreserved. It was purchased in 1890 by the South Australian Woollen Factory Company, Ltd (a local syndicate) and Robert Redpath appointed manager.

By 1892 Jeffrey was working for the company as head wool classer Later known as Onkaparinga Woollen Company, it became a major industry, and its pure wool rugs sold Australia-wide.

=== Teaching ===
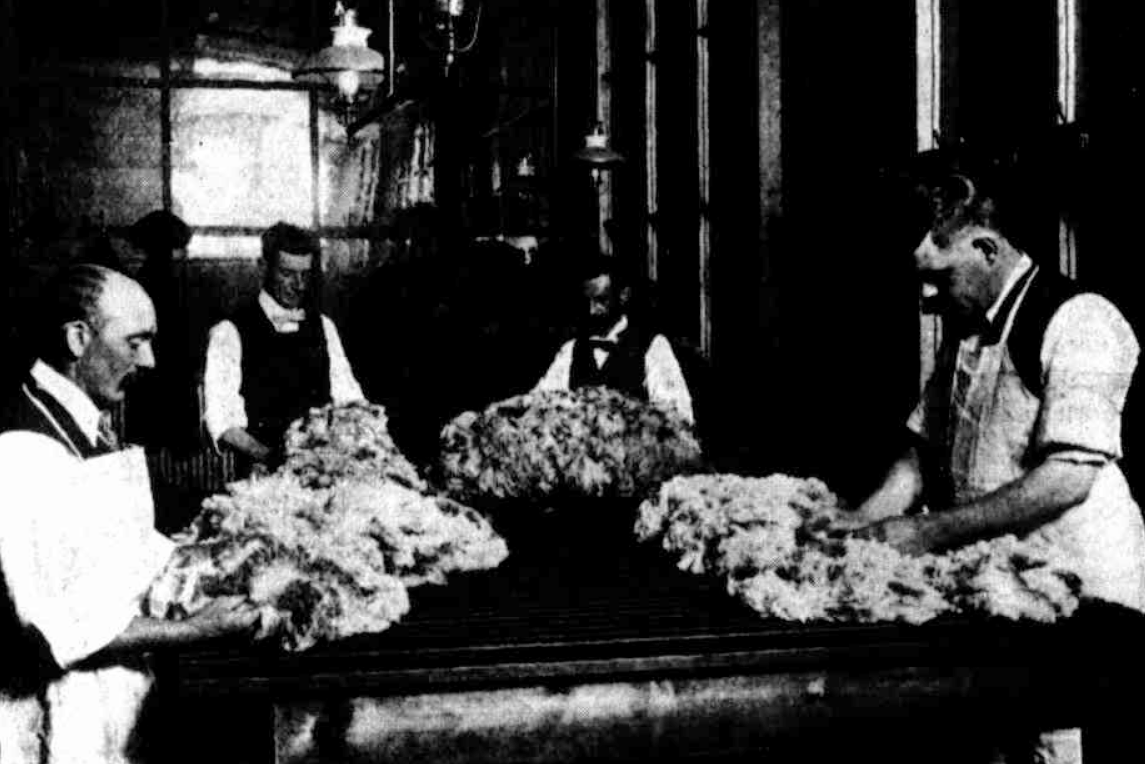
Jeffrey and students

In 1897 he appealed to the Council of the School of Mines, through its president Langdon Bonython, to include woolclassing in the curriculum. Bonython agreed that if six students enrolled, a year's course in wool classing could be funded. A. E. Hamilton (Note: Albert Edward (mostly A. E., sometimes "Bert") Hamilton (c. April 1895–1964) was son of Edward Hamilton and Mary Jane Hamilton who married in 1893; was chairman of the Royal Agricultural Society 1926–28 and of Stockowners' Association 1923–25, director Bagot's Executor Co., Onkaparinga Woollen Company, and many other companies.) found twenty candidates and an evening class, conducted by Jeffrey, began in the third term of 1897. Among the students was Spencer Williams, later with Goldsbrough Mort, and (later Sir) Walter Duncan.

First and second year classes began in 1898 and day classes began in 1899. First graduates (in 1901) were Hamilton and Norman Bickford. Later graduates include A. H. Codrington and C. A. Goddard (1903), Spen Williams (1906) and Ewen Waterman (1926).

He resigned from the Lobethal factory to become an instructor and lecturer at the School of Mines and later at Roseworthy Agricultural College.

Alfred S. Cheadle, G. W. Cooper, and George Dowling were examiners in woolclassing from 1900.

Tom P. Reid, Dalgety's wool expert, credited the School of Mines' woolclassing course with achieving cooperation of growers in classifying their wool clips correctly.

=== Business ===
In 1905 Jeffrey resigned from the School of Mines for a partnership in the woolbroking firm of Luxmoore, Dowling & Jeffrey, which shortly developed links with stock and station agents Bagot, Shakes & Lewis, Ltd. The two firms amalgamated in 1911. When George Wallwall Bagot died on 8 July 1919, his joint managing director John Lewis retired, and Jeffrey and Lance Lewis were appointed by the committee as their replacements.

He had some (unspecified) part in the absorption of Bagot, Shakes & Lewis by the Sydney firm of Goldsbrough Mort & Co. in 1924.

Sometime around 1920 Jeffrey left Bagot, Shakes & Lewis for the American wool buyers Lothrop, Bennett & Gillman, but while in Melbourne was struck by a motor car, resulting in a fracture of the thigh, putting him out of action for a year. Consequently he withdrew, and on recovery accepted the position of Australian superintendent for H. Dawson & Co., of Bradford, UK. He retired in 1926, but was retained by them as a consultant.

During WWII Jeffrey served as a member of the Australian Wool Council, chairman of both the State Wool Committee, and the Technical Advisory Committee which negotiated prices wool growers received under the stabilisation scheme.

=== Character ===
Mr Jeffrey was a man of unlimited energy, and although not at any time robust, he never let up until a few years ago. In his younger days he never walked but always ran, and there were few better known men in South Australia. [Sir Walter Duncan]

== Other business interests ==
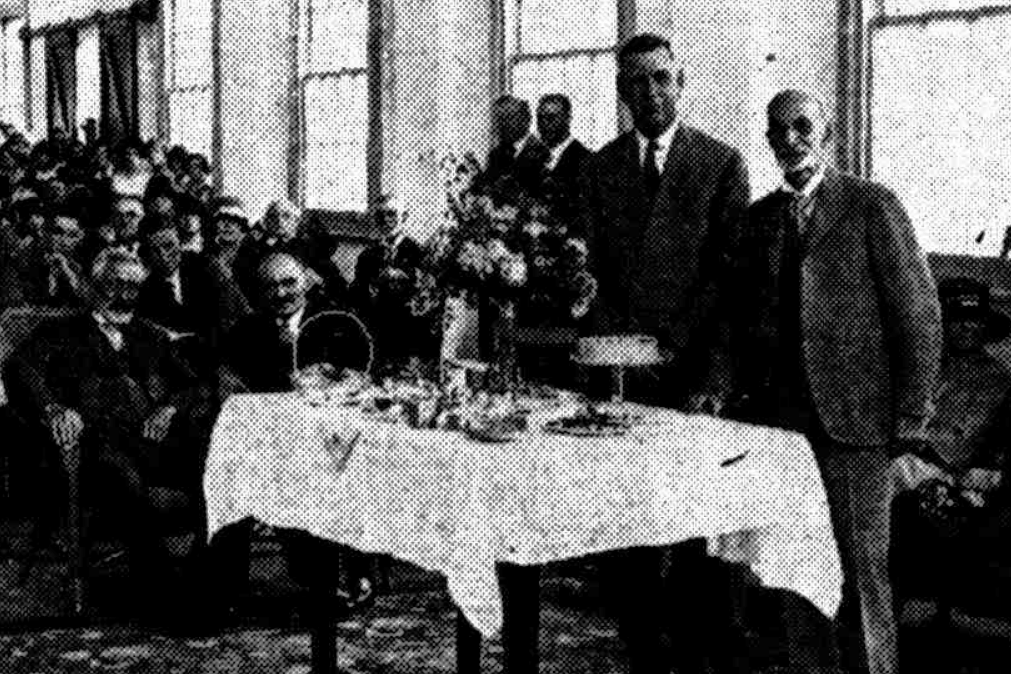
Premier Butler and Jeffrey at Lobethal

Jeffrey was a director of

- Lobethal Woollen Company (later Onkaparinga Woollen Mills)
- South Australian Woollen Company Ltd (chairman)
- Great Victoria United NL (gold miner)
- Guinea Airways Ltd (chairman)

== Publications ==
- Australian Woolclassing (1899), which became a standard work
- Practical Handbook on Sheep and Wool for the Farmer (1907), dedicated to A. E. Hamilton, "the one who was mainly instrumental in starting the wool classes".

== Recognition ==
- Jeffrey's achievement in developing the course was publicly recognised by students, led by Hamilton.
- He was appointed chairman of the Advisory Board of Agriculture in 1917.
- He was invested as Commander of the British Empire in the New Year's Honors of 1937.
- In 1954 Jeffrey was honoured in the name of a street34.909°S 138.8738°E in Lobethal.

== Family ==
Jeffrey married Frances Annie (c. 1868 – 1 March 1946) in 1891

- Helen Jeffrey (26 March 1892 – 6 November 1935) married Sergeant Russell Hope Harris on 25 March 1916. She died in America.
- Grace Jeffrey (3 March 1896 – )
- George Jeffrey (18 July 1900 – ) at Albert Street, Goodwood Park
- Nancy Jeffrey (2 April 1905 – ) at Blackwood

Jeffrey died at their home, 311 Kensington road, Kensington Park, SA; built in 1925.
