= Agricultural Bureau of South Australia =

The Agricultural Bureau of South Australia, also known as the Advisory Board of Agriculture, was an instrumentality of the Government of the State of South Australia, founded in 1902 as an amalgamation of the Central Bureau of Agriculture, the Dairy Board and the council of the Agricultural College.

== History ==
The Central Bureau of Agriculture was formed in 1888 following a suggestion by Albert Molineux and supported by R. Homburg MP and Jenkin Coles. The Commissioner of Crown Lands, Sir Samuel Davenport appointed Dr Schomburgk, Professor Lowrie, B. Homburg, W. A. Horn, F. E. H. W. Krichauff, Molineux, Henry Kelly (of the RAHS), and J. Ednie Brown (Conservator of Forests) to the foundation committee. In September 1888, Charles Jonas Valentine, Chief Inspector of Stock, was added to their number. George Leonard Darby, of the Forest Department, was appointed clerical secretary, but after a few months he resigned, overwhelmed by the work. Finding a replacement proved difficult so Molineux took it on rather than risk the project's failure, resigning his position as Agricultural Editor for The Adelaide Observer. In February 1889 he was appointed secretary full time, which required he resign from the Bureau, Thomas Hardy filling the vacancy.

The aims and duties of the Bureau were:

- to gather information respecting plants, animals, and products likely to prove of value to cultivators.
- to discover the best methods of cultivating various crops, and of breeding and feeding domestic animals; also how to improve the same.
- methods of preparing and preserving produce for market; and to identify where markets exist.
- to collect statistics on agricultural subjects: the area under cultivation in each district; number and breeds of animals; nature and condition of the crops during each month: times of sowing; planting and harvesting; yields of and cost of cultivation of each kind of crop; pests affecting the farm, forest, garden, orchard, and vineyard.
- to ascertain and suggest the best means for eradicating noxious plants, and for combating the effects of disease or ailments of domestic animals. To prevent as far as possible, the introduction and spread of such pests; and to encourage reporting of previously unknown plants, or parasites upon plants, or of diseases of animals, in order that they may be at once identified and dealt with.

Having collected such information, the Bureau was to publish it for the benefit of producers by means of the press and aided by the branches.

=== Branches ===
Communities of producers were encouraged to form branches for collecting and disseminating relevant information, those at Burra, Nuriootpa, Stansbury, and Mannum being formed in May 1888, and after 12 months 18 branch bureaus had been established, of which 13 were still active. The branches were independent, self-governing, and without remuneration. In 1905, when the Central Bureau was dissolved and the branch bureaus were coordinated by the Advisory Board of Agriculture, there were 104 branch bureaus. By 1909 there were 114 active branches and in 1948 there were 349, including Women's and kids'.

== Dissolution ==
Perhaps in response to criticisms in the Press of the unwieldy character of the South Australian public service, and triggered by the resignation of dairy expert George Sutherland Thomson, the Government in 1902 requested resignation of members of the Agricultural Bureau, together with those of the Dairy Board and the council of the Agricultural College, whose duties and responsibilities overlapped, so that a single board could be created. The Bureau held its final meeting, on 16 June 1902. There was only one item of business, to bury itself. Assurances were given that the branch bureaus would continue as before, as would the Journal of Agriculture. Molineux, who was largely responsible for the success of the Bureau, and had graciously accepted its demise, was honoured by the retiring members. Minister of Agriculture Richard Butler outlined the composition of the new Board of Agriculture: it would consist of the president of the Royal Agricultural and Horticultural Society, ex officio, a representative of the Vignerons' Association, a representative of the dairy industry, and two practical farmers.

The first Advisory Board of Agriculture was appointed in 1905, with John Miller as president and Walter Lloyd Summers as secretary.

== Office holders ==
=== President ===
- F. E. H. W. Krichauff — 1888 to 1902
- Robert Caldwell — 1902 to 1904
- John Miller — 1905 to 1907
- G. R. Laffer — 1907 to 1909
- J. Wallace Sandford — 1909 to 1911
- A. M. Dawkins (Note: Albert Maynard Dawkins OBE was father of Boyd Dawkins) — 1911 to 1913
- G. R. Laffer — 1913 to 1915
- Fred Coleman — 1915 to 1917
- George Jeffrey — 1917 to 1920
- C. J. Tuckwell — 1920 to 1922
- W. S. Kelly — 1922 to 1925
- A. M. Dawkins — 1925 to 1927
- P. H. Jones — 1927 to 1929
- P. Coleman — 1929 to 1931
- H. N. Wicks — 1931 to 1933
- A. J. Cooke — 1933 to 1935
- A. L. McEwin — 1935 to 1937
- Sir J. Wallace Sandford — 1937 to 1938
- S. Shepherd — 1938 to 1941
- Prof. J. A. Prescott — 1941 to 1943
- J. B. Murdoch — 1943 to 1945
- A. J. A. Koch — 1945 to 1947
- P. J. Baily 1947 —

=== Secretary ===
- A. Molineux — February 1889 to 1908.
- W. L. Summers — July 1908 to June 1911.
- G. G. Nicholls — July 1911 to January 1915.
- H. J. Finnis — February 1915 to January 1926.
- F. C. Richards (acting) — February 1926 to July 1927.
- H. C. Pritchard — August 1827 to December 1942.
- F. C. Richards — March 1943 to .
