= Abraham Davis =

Abraham Davis may refer to:

- Abraham Hopkins Davis (1796–1866), Australian businessman
- Abraham Lincoln Davis (1914–1978), American minister
