= Royal Adelaide Show =

Carnival and agricultural show in Adelaide, South Australia

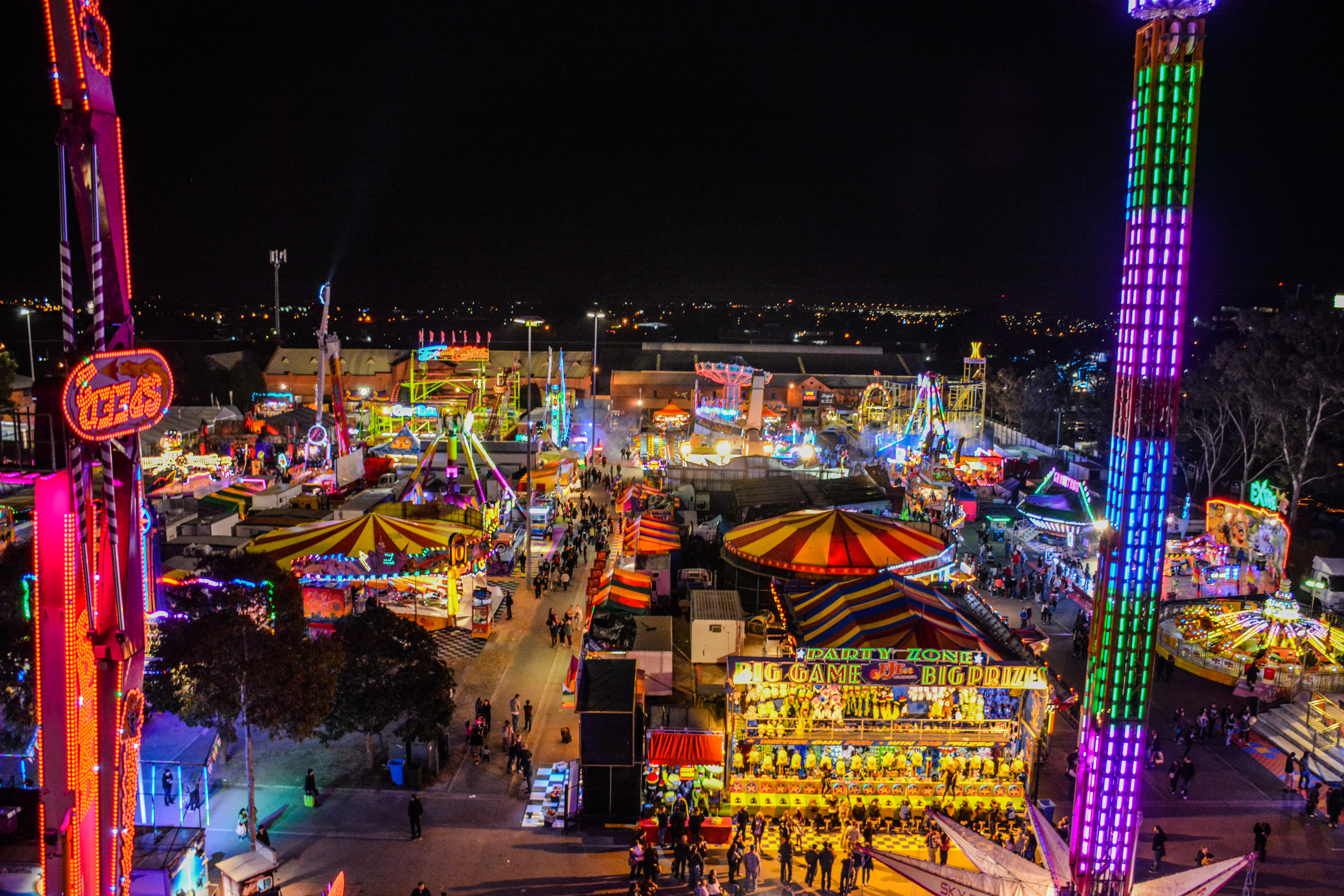
- Aerial view of the Show in 2014
- Status: Active
- Genre: Agricultural show
- Begins: Early September or Late August
- Ends: Early or Mid September
- Frequency: Annual
- Locations: Adelaide Showground, Wayville, South Australia, Australia
- Years active: 187
- Inaugurated: 1839
- Previous event: 5 - 13 September 2026
- Next event: 4 - 12 September 2027
- Attendance: 500,000+
- Organiser: Royal Agricultural and Horticultural Society of South Australia
- Website: www.theshow.com.au

The Royal Adelaide Show is an annual carnival and agricultural show in Adelaide, South Australia, Australia. First established in 1839 by the Royal Agricultural and Horticultural Society of South Australia, the event has been held annually since 1925 at the dedicated Adelaide Showground venue, located in the suburb of Wayville.

Core to the show are the competitive entries, such as livestock, pets, arts, food, beverages, and displays of skill. The show features entries in 63 competitive sections, and attracts over 31,000 entries annually. In addition, the show features entertainment, exhibitors, sideshows, rides, and showbags. It is attended by over 500,000 people annually, making it one of the state's biggest events and among the most attended of its type in Australia. It is also regarded as "the longest running event on the South Australian calendar".

== History ==
=== Colonial era ===
The South Australian Agricultural Society was founded on 28 October 1839 "for the advancement of agricultural and pastoral knowledge, and to promote the development of the natural resources of our noble colony". On 8 December 1840, the first Show was held in the yards of Fordham's Hotel, Grenfell Street, and was an exhibition of produce which included vegetables, cereals, cheese, wool, and leather. The first show of livestock, the Agricultural Exhibition, was held on 20 October 1843 at Auction Mart Tavern, Hindley Street. From 1844 to 1859, the Agricultural and Horticultural Shows, displaying both produce and livestock, were held at Botanic Park, and for many decades, shows were held twice a year in Spring and Autumn. The show was briefly suspended in 1852 during the Victorian Gold Rush.

In 1856, the society held its first art exhibition: there were 178 entries, with 30 being from the well-known artist S. T. Gill. According to the South Australian Register (28 November 1867) "A special Grand General Show was held from Thursday 7 November 1867 to coincide with the Adelaide visit of Prince Alfred, Duke of Edinburgh". After the duke's visit, the society and show went on to receive his royal patronage in 1868.

In 1887, the society ran their Spring Show concurrently with the Adelaide Jubilee International Exhibition, from 14 to 17 September, but at the "Old Exhibition Grounds" on the other side of Frome Road. The show had been extended from two to four days on account of the great interest shown, particularly in the display of sheep, which was of a very high standard. From May 1895, the Autumn Show was held at a new venue, the Jubilee Exhibition Building on North Terrace, and the horse events were held at the nearby Jubilee Oval. In 1896, the first Live Stock Show was held at the new site.

=== 20th century ===
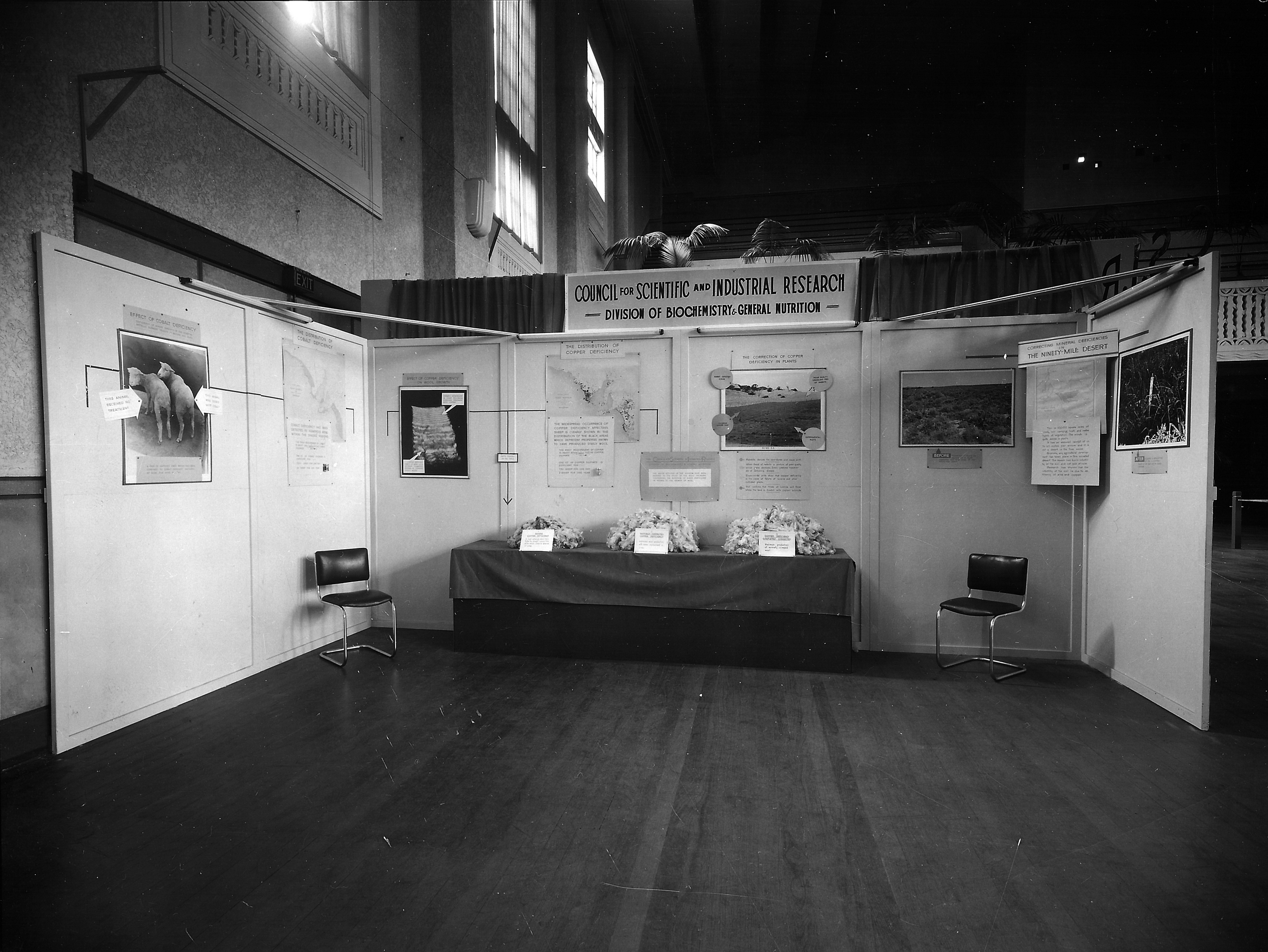
CSIRO display (1949)

There were no shows held in 1915–1919 due to the effects of World War I and the Spanish flu epidemic. In 1925, the show became an annual event, and moved to Wayville. A report regarding the new site stated:

The competition for best design for the new showgrounds drew fifty responses and twenty six firm designs. Mr C R Heath's design was awarded first prize of £500. Designs came from New Zealand, England and all Australian States. The Building Committee, consisting of the President and Vice-Presidents and the Secretary, was appointed to supervise the work and confer with the architects and to report to the Executive. A railway siding was negotiated with the Railway Department, drainage and sewerage problems addressed, negotiations initiated with the Tramways Trust for an 'electric car' service, grading and levelling planned, and tenders called for erection of facilities. A fine draught horse pavilion has been erected and the building of a sheep pavilion commenced.

The site's main pavilion, Centennial Hall, was opened on 20 March 1936. Between 1940 and 1946, shows were cancelled, with the exception of a Wine Show in 1946, due to World War II and the military occupation of the grounds.

The main ferris wheel at the entrance of the Royal Adelaide Show in 2005.

In February 1966, a soccer match between traditional rivals Hellas and Juventus on the opening night of the show created much interest. Another area of interest was the Decimal Currency Board's display, with the 'Dollar Girls' on hand to explain the new monetary system to be introduced.

In the 1960s to 1980s, new competitive sections for the blind and disabled were introduced, plus an additional four classes in the knitting and crochet section for the over 70s. Main Arena attractions included the Pacific Islands Regiment Band, which consisted of 75 Papuans and New Guineans from all parts of the territory. They joined with the Royal Australian Navy Band, the Band of the Southern Command, the Band of the Central Command, and the SA Police Band, for a massed band display. In 1990, $1.3 million was spent on capital improvements.

Prior to 1987, with a three-term school year, the show was always held in a school holiday period. With the changeover to a four-term year, arrangements were made between the show organisers and the Department for Education whereby Adelaide schools arrange a study-free day, enabling their pupils to attend the event.

=== Present ===
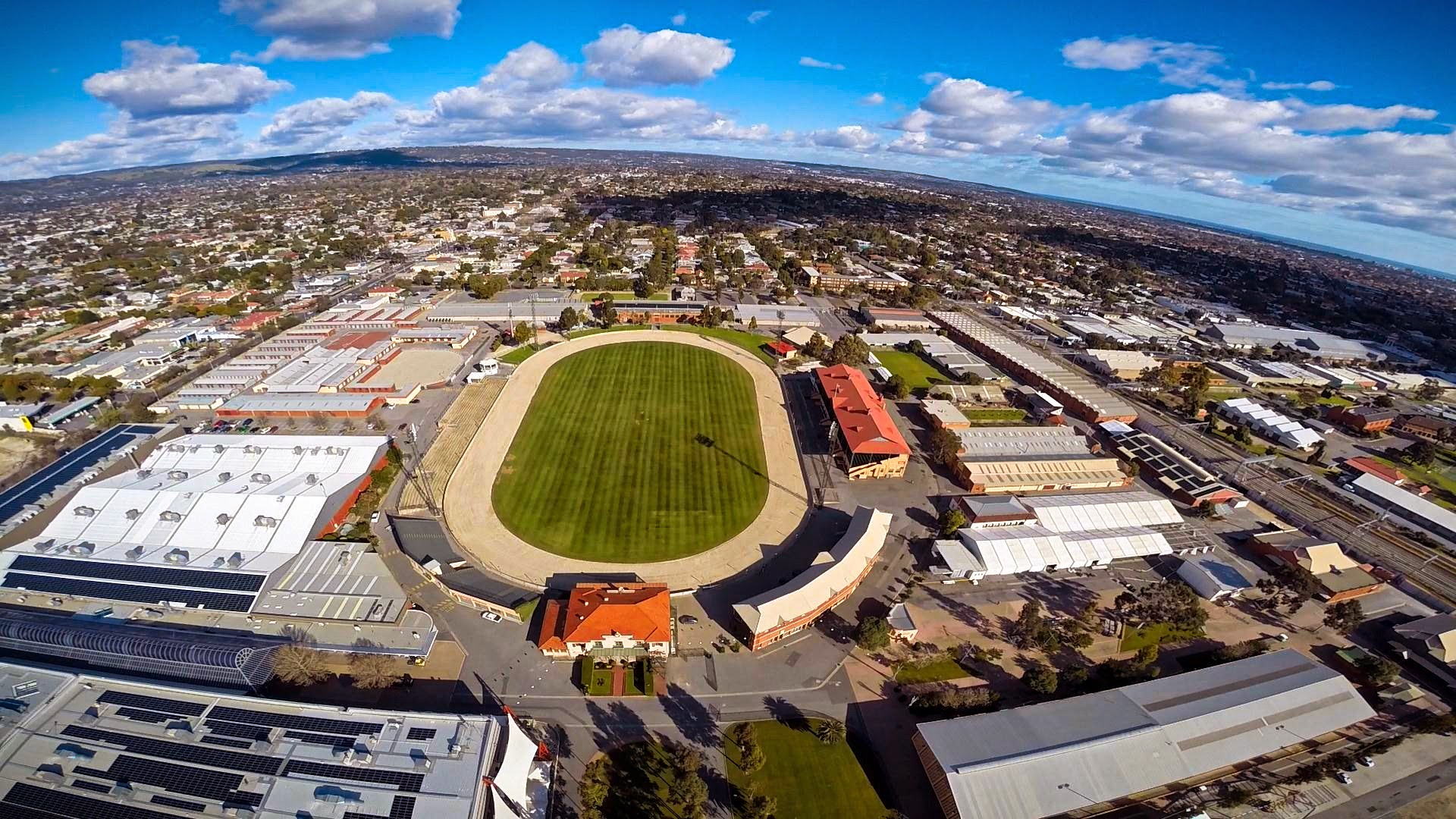
Panoramic view of the site (2017)

In 2004, 'The Wine Tunnel' with wine tastings was introduced to showcase South Australia's wines. Located in the Taste SA area, it also has cooking demonstrations and food samplings. In 2007, Centennial Hall was demolished due to the structural weakening of its concrete.

The Adelaide Showground railway station opened permanently on 17 February 2014. Unlike the temporary Showground Central railway station (2003–2013), which was only operated during the show, the new station is serviced every day as a regular part of the Seaford, Flinders, and Belair lines.

In 2017, the Main Carnival underwent a major face-lift with new paving, walkways, grass areas, toilets, bins and trees being added to replace the gravel and portable toilets.

On 14 April 2020, the Royal Agricultural and Horticultural Society of South Australia announced the show would be cancelled due to concerns surrounding the coronavirus. The following year the 2021 show was scheduled to go ahead but was cancelled about three weeks before the show; this is due to risks associated with the Delta variant. After a two-year hiatus, the show returned in 2022.

== Competitions ==
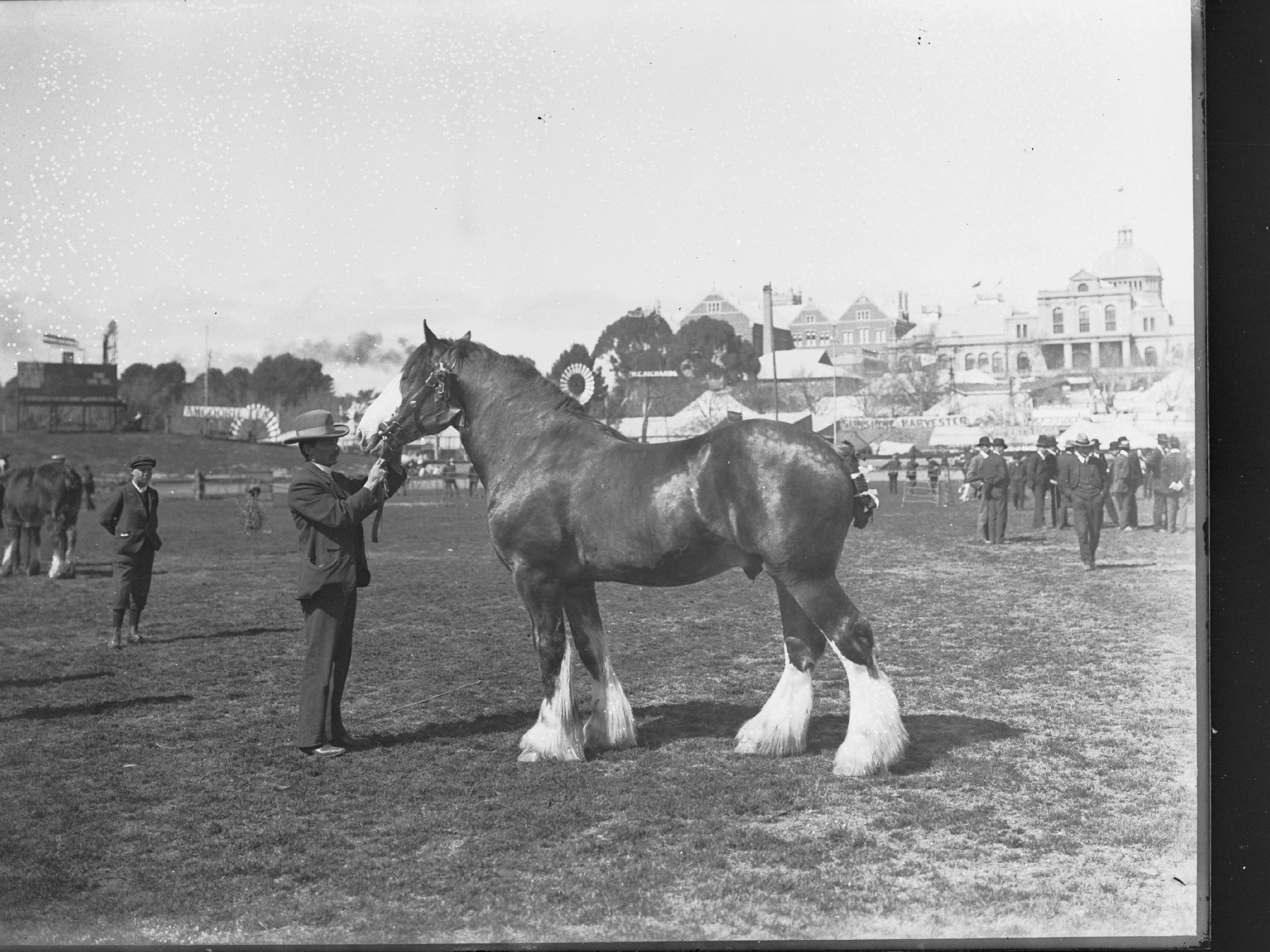
Agricultural Show on Frome Road, Adelaide, c. 1905.

The society runs a number of competitive sections at the show in six categories:

- Livestock: alpacas, beef cattle, dairy cattle, goats, horses, pigs, poultry/pigeons & eggs, sheep & wool.
- Pets: aquarium fish, caged birds, cats, cavies, dogs, dog grooming, flyball, rabbits, reptiles.
- Food & beverage: beer & cider, chocolate, commercial fruit, dairy products, grains & fodder, honey, olive oil, professional baking, spirits, wine.
- Junior competitions: cookery, Girl Guides, horticulture, junior art/craft/design, junior textiles, Scouts, technology, young judges.
- Individual talents: art prize, cookery, farriers & blacksmiths, handicrafts, horticulture, orchids, photography, sheaf tossing, woodchopping.
- Entertainment: drones, mascots, sheep dog trials, ute show.

In 2014, 16,993 ribbons were awarded to individual prize winners.

== Carnival ==
Stunt motorbikes at the Speedway in 2012, an annual performance.

=== Entertainment ===
The Main Arena is the largest area of Adelaide Showground, and is the primary location for the 'Horses in Action' program (including the World Cup Qualifiers). In the evening, it features family entertainment, including V8 utes, motocross, and monster trucks. Every night of the show at 9:00 pm (weather permitting), there is a 10-minute firework show.

Another major attraction to the Royal Adelaide Show is the array of free entertainment included upon entry. There are three main stages:

- The Kid's Corner is located in the Kid's Carnival area (Goyder Plaza) and hosts musical and comedic entertainment for a younger audience such as The Wiggles, Peppa Pig, and PAW Patrol.
- Goyder Stage is host to the show's major productions (e.g. Tinker Tailor Fashion Maker in 2014; The Magical Gift of Mother Earth in 2015).
- The Golden North Ice Cream Stage (since 2017) is located centrally at the end of Hamilton Boulevard and hosts performances including dance, music, and talent. The old Coca-Cola Stage was retired in 2016. The stage was renamed the BankSA stage for the 2022 show.

=== Rides ===
Big Bubble Bump Ride at the show in 2019.

The rides are a major drawcard at the show. Each year the event boasts over 50 rides between the Carnival and Kid's Carnival areas. The best-known ride is the permanent Skymaster Wheel standing over 40 metres high. Each year, rides can vary with some favourites going and newer rides appearing. Some larger rides in the main carnival range in price from $8 to $20 (e.g. Speed 2 and The Beast). However most rides average at $10 with discounts available on select rides.

During the 2000 show, the Spin Dragon collapsed, injuring around 40 people, while during the 2006 show, part of the Twin Flip ride collapsed, injuring four people. On the last day of the 2007 Show, the Mad Mouse roller coaster was retired from service. The track was dismantled, the cars auctioned off (one donated to the Royal Show's archives). It was replaced with two portable coasters, a Zyklon model ZL42 roller coaster imported from Italy named The Big Dipper, and a Spinning wild mouse named Crazy Coaster. Both were very popular at the 2008 show. On 12 September 2014, an eight-year-old girl visiting Australia from Malaysia died after slipping from her seat on the Airmaxx 360. Operators of the machine, C J And Sons Amusement, were later fined $157,000 due to inadequate maintenance. In the 2019 show, The Beast, XXXL, Speed 2 and Extreme were banned from the Royal Adelaide Show for having a faulty backup restraint mechanism. The Happy Kangaroo ride was also banned for unknown reasons, despite appearing in the catalogue.

=== Showbags ===
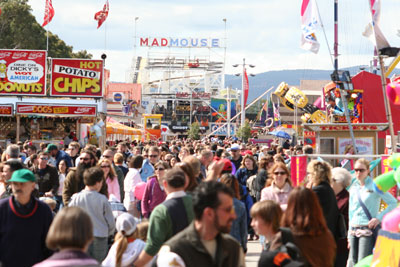
Royal Adelaide Show in 2005.

One of the most notable and well known aspects of the show are the showbags. They are sold in the Showbag Pavilion next to the Main Arena, and are mainly promotion for the companies that produce them. From the 1900s, showbags started as free sample bags that were given to visitors of displays. By the 1950s, as the original showbags grew in popularity, they eventually ceased to be free and a small fee of 3 or 6 pence was taken. Nowadays, over 350 different bags are available, and a single showbag can range from $3 to $135 depending on its contents. Showbags are mostly popular with young children and teenagers, although there are some showbags, such as Breaking Bad and Darrell Lea, aimed at a more adult market.

== See also ==
- Agritourism
- RAHS timeline historical list of show dates
