= RAHS timeline =

A list of Royal Agricultural and Horticultural Society shows and other functions arranged chronologically:

== Timeline ==
- 9 December 1839: meeting chaired by David McLaren to ratify Society rules. Among those present were George Stevenson, Dr. John Knott (c. 1806 – 21 October 1850) and William Smillie.
- 28 October 1840: Show Society founded with McLaren its first President.
- 6 December 1840: first Show held in the grounds of Fordham's Hotel followed by the first Annual General Meeting of the South Australian Agricultural Society.
- 2 March 1841: second Show (though it has been reckoned the first), also held behind Fordham's Hotel.
- 16 February 1842: third Show, held at South Australian Company's schoolroom on North Terrace opposite Government House, between Gawler Place and Stephens Place. The Society had by this time been reorganised as the South Australian Agricultural and Horticultural Society.
- 17 March 1843 (Friday): held at John Bentham Neales' Adelaide Auction Company's rooms on the corner of King William Street. Judges included John Ridley for wheat. The Show was made possible by donations from sponsors co-opted by John Morphett, as the Society had no funds.
- 1844 Agricultural Society formally established
- 14 February 1844 (Wednesday): held in the Parklands near the Frome Road bridge.
- April 1844 a breakaway group calling itself the "Agricultural Society of South Australia", formed by Secretary J. Wotherspoon, began conducting separate meetings with the intention of taking over. The situation was resolved at a special meeting.
- 4 September 1844: first Cattle Show, held at Samuel Stocks, jun.' yards in Grenfell Street.
- 14 February 1845 (Friday): the wine heavily criticised but other produce judged as excellent.
- 19,20 February 1846 (Thursday, Friday): the Show and Fair now over two days.
- 11,12 February 1847 Thursday, Friday
- 10,11 February 1848 Thursday, Friday
- 22,23 February 1849 Thursday, Friday (this and later Midsummer Shows were held on the third Thursday of February and the Fair on the Friday. A Dinner was held on the Friday evening. The choice of dates was influenced by the need for moonlight.)
  From around this time the RAHS AGM was held the following Friday.
- 21,22 February 1850 Thursday, Friday
- 13,14 February 1851 Thursday, Friday
- 26,27 February 1852 Thursday, Friday
- 17,18 February 1853 Thursday, Friday
- 23,24 February 1854 Thursday, Friday
- 15,16 February 1855 Thursday, Friday
- 7 November 1855 Wednesday Flower and Fruit Show
- 28,29 February 1856 Thursday, Friday
- 18,19 February 1857 Wednesday
- 18,19 February 1858 Thursday, Friday
- 1858 publication of Farm and Garden, price sixpence, edited gratis by E. W. Andrews. The first issue was reproduced on Page 3 in the Register of 29 December 1857 which periodical published excerpts. The last issue was for June 1863.
- 17,18 February 1859 Thursday, Friday
- 11 August 1859?? Ploughing match when was the first?,
- 29 February,1 March 1860 Wednesday, Thursday
- 4 October 1860 Thursday Stock (draught stock, blood horse stock, cattle, sheep, swine) show at cattle yards (the first?)
- 21 February 1861 Thursday was there a Fair on the Friday?
- 15 August 1861 Thursday Ploughing Match and exhibition of farm equipment
- 8 October 1861 Tuesday Stock show
- 17 December 1861 Annual reaping match (the first?)
- 13 February 1862 Thursday Annual Show
- 16 October 1862 Thursday Stock show
- 30 December 1862 reaping match
- 12 February 1863 Annual show
- 6 August 1863 ploughing match. At this stage free entry to all shows. Prizes for Annual Show largely from Government grants.
- 15 October 1863 Stock show
- 25 February 1864 Annual show at Exhibition Building in North Parklands. Special trains at reduced fares.
- 6 October 1864 Cattle Show
- 23 February 1865 Annual Show first with entry fees? gate takings amounted to £150 11s. 10d.
- 10 August 1865 ploughing, and as usual show of horse stock and implements
- 12 October 1865 Cattle Show
- 22 February 1866 Annual show gate receipts £260 10s.
- 9 August 1866 ploughing match
- 11 October 1866 Cattle show
- 21 February 1867 Annual show
- 22 August 1867 ploughing match
- 7–9 November 1867 Thursday to Saturday; at the instigation of secretary Ebenezer Ward, a "Grand General Show" was held during visit of Prince Alfred, Duke of Edinburgh. 70 gold and 100 silver medals produced by Adelaide jeweller J. M. Wendt.
- 5 March 1868 Thursday, "Grand Annual Exhibition" (i.e. Annual Show) raised £177
- April 1868, Prince Alfred accepted the role of Patron of the Society, which then became the Royal Agricultural and Horticultural Society of South Australia
- 7 August 1868 Thursday, ploughing match and show of entire horses at south-east Parklands spoiled by wintry weather
- 29 October 1868 Thursday, Spring Show: moderate attendance due to sultry weather. Society heavily (£1,200) in debt.
- 25 February 1869 Thursday "Grand Annual Exhibition" highly successful
- 19 August 1869 Thursday ploughing match and show of horses at Hughes' farm, Greenhill Road
- 14 October 1869 Thursday October Show rivaling February show in popularity
- 16,17 February 1870 Wednesday, Thursday "Grand Annual Exhibition" first two-day Show
- 11 August 1870 ploughing match - losing popularity
- 29 September 1870 Exhibition becoming very like the February Exhibition
- 23,24 February 1871
- 31 August 1871 additional show chiefly for sheep (between lambing and shearing seasons) but also horses birds fruit veges and flowers
- 26 October 1870 first shearing comp.
- January 1872 first wine show judging
- 21,22 February 1872 Annual Show
- 22 August 1872 "interim show", ploughing match following day
- 16,17 October 1872 shearing again and horse and buggy trials
- 20,21 February 1873 Thursday, Friday
- 20,21 August 1873 stud sheep, horses, cattle prize Silver Cup made by Henry Muirhead (c. 1812 – 23 February 1880)
- 30,31 October 1873 show
- 25,26 February 1874 show Wednesday, Thursday (the most popular of the three)
- 27 August 1874 ploughing match following day
- 19 November 1874 Thursday. Late. By this time Vic and NSW are holding only one annual Show
- 18,19 February 1875
- 26 August 1875 stock show now includes Angoras, Alpacas, Llamas, deer, and goats in milk; ploughing match next day
- 11 November 1875 Thursday
- 24 February 1876 reverted to one-day show
- 6 September 1876 livestock etc, ploughing next day
- 22 December 1876 trial of reapers, mowers and winnowers at Buck's Head Hotel, Stepney
- 22 February 1877 low attendance due to rain
- 6 September 1877
- 20 December 1877 trial of agricultural machinery, becomes annual event
- 27,28 February 1878 return to 2-day Show
- 12 September 1878 part of Hospital paddock leased for showing horses
- February 1879 no February show?
- 18 September 1879
- 26 February 1880 Thursday
- 16 September 1880
- 24 February 1881
- 14,15 September 1881 Wednesday, Thursday joint Exhibition with entrepreneurs Joubert & Twopeny
- 1,2 March 1882
- 13,14 September 1882
- 8 March 1883
- 13,14 September 1883
- 6 March 1884
- 24,25 September 1884
- 23 October 1884 trial of hay harvesting machines
- 5 March 1885
- 17–19 September 1885
- 11–13 March 1886 Thursday, Friday, Saturday horses in action
- 16,17 September 1886
- 3–5 March 1887 as per 1886
- 21 June 1887 Grand Exposition
- 14–17 September 1887 extended from two to four days due to unprecedented public interest, as it fell within Jubilee Exhibition.
- 1 March 1888
- 25,26 October 1888 harvesting machinery trial at Salisbury
- 29 November 1888 Summer show held at Adelaide Town Hall, very poor turnout
- 7 March 1889 Autumn Show at old show grounds
- 12,13 September 1889
- 7 November 1889 harvesting machinery at Salisbury again - special train
- 6,7 March 1890
- 19 September 1890 first annual dinner
- 18–20 September 1890 Spring Show. when did half holiday start for Show?
- no November show
- 19–21 March 1891
- 17–19 September 1891
- 10–12 March 1892
- 15–17 September 1892 fewer spectators maybe due to increased admission
- 2,3 March 1893
- 27 July 1893 Pruning match at Mrs Holbrook's vineyard, Bankside
- 14–16 September 1893
- 1–3 March 1894
- 13–15 September 1894
- 31 December Jubilee Exhibition Building and grounds rented to RAHS for 21 years at £100 p.a.
- 17 January 1895 winnower field trial
- 28 February – 2 March 1895 first show at Jubilee Exhibition Building
- 23 August 1895 annual ploughing and digging match poor turnout
- 12–14 September 1895 stock etc show
- 27–29 February 1896 (in future first Thursday, no night)
- 15 July 1896 pruning match
- 1 August 1896 sheepdog trial at Morphettville racecourse
- 17–19 September 1896
- 4 March 1897
- 9–11 September 1897
- 3–5 March 1898 fewer visitors
- 20 July 1898 pruning match
- 8–10 September 1898
- 2–4 March 1899
- 14–16 September 1899
- 1–3 March 1900
- 13–15 September 1900

== Twentieth Century ==
- 7–9 March 1901
- 12–14 September 1901
- 6–8 March 1902 Exhibition grounds extended to Bowling Club, Destitute Asylum and Police barracks "between powder magazine and Adelaide Club's bowling green bordering on Victoria Avenue" where? ..south side abutting the railway line ...
- 11–13 September 1902
- 28 November 1902 harvester trials
- 5–7 February 1903 now mostly machinery and horses
- 26 February 1903 Egg laying competition at Magill Boys' Reformatory commenced, extending over a year. The State Children's Council, led by Miss Spence, Lady Bonython and Miss Clark, dismayed at the disruption to the work of the Reformatory caused by the experiment, vetoed its continuance for a further year.
- 10–12 September 1903
- 3–5 February 1904
- 7–10 September new prizes: Angas Cups for draught stallion, Merino ewe from bequest of J. H. Angas. New grandstand, sheep pavilion. Secretary Creswell credited with increased patronage, interest, profit (£1,000) now four days.
- 2–4 March 1905
- 13–16 September
- 1,2,3 March 1906
- 12–15 September
- 7–9 March 1907
- April conclusion of third egg-laying contest and last conducted by RA&HS. Future contests conducted by Utility Poultry Club.
- 11–14 September
- 5–7 March 1908
- 9–12 September
- 4–6 March 1909 (Duncan & Fraser had been using Machinery Hall to assemble tramcars; had to vacate)
- 15–18 September (held a week later to coincide (as usual) with Port Adelaide Racing Club meeting)
- 3–5 March 1910 (rain all day Saturday - very poor attendance resulting in financial loss £206)
- 14–17 September
- 2–4 March 1911
- 13–16 September
- 7–9 March 1912
- 11–14 September 1912
- 6–8 March 1913 A loss of £187.
- 10–13 September 1913
- 5–7 March 1914
- 9–11 September Show goes on despite severe drought and outbreak of WWI
- No Autumn Show 1915
- Spring Show cancelled as Exhibition Grounds commandeered by Army
- No Autumn Show 1916 but work progresses on Wayville grounds
- No September Show, but Country shows continue and successful
- No Autumn Show 1917
- 11–15 September (started Tuesday, first five-day Show) profits to patriotic funds
- 7–9 March 1918 successful show but loss of £367
- 10–14 September 1918
- No Autumn Show 1919 as grounds commandeered by health authorities due to influenza epidemic
- No Spring Show 1919
- 4–6 March 1920 & Work on new grounds resumed
- 14–18 September 1920
- 3,4 March 1921 first 2-day show
- 14–18 September 1921
- 2,3 March 1922
- 12–16 September 1922
- No Autumn Show 1923, in fact the last ever
- 11–15 September 1923 Government grant of £30,000 to complete work at Wayville
- 9–13 September 1924
- 8–12 September 1925 first at new grounds, variously described as Keswick and Wayville West
- 2,4–9 October 1926 (Saturday to Saturday, excepting Sunday) First Show at Wayville, first to have prizes for cookery
- 12 March 1927 Horses in Action Show
- 1 July pruning championship
- 24,26–30 September Car carnival, horses in action,
- 1928: 8,10–15 September (Saturday to Saturday)
- 1929: 14,16–21 September
- 1930: 13,15–20 September
- 1931: 12,14–19 September
- 1932: 10,12–17 September
- 1933: 9,11–16 September
- 1934: 6,8–13 October (visit by H.R.H. the Duke of Gloucester on 12 October)
- 1935: 14,16–21 September
- 1936: 5,7–12 September Centenary Show
- 1937: 7,9–14 September Kidman Gates officially opened
- 1938: 8–10,12–15 (Thursday to Thursday)
- 1939: 7–9,11–14 September (ditto)
- 1940: Show cancelled Army occupying Wayville, promised to vacate in time for 1947 Show.

== Postwar ==
- 1947: 4–6,8–11 September
- 1948: 9–11,13–16 September
- 1949: Horticultural Exhibition 25,26 March
- 1949: 8–10,12–15 September
- 1950: 7–9,11–16 (Thursday to Saturday) September. Included Australian Band Championships.
- 1951: 6–8,10–15 September
- 1952: 4–6,8–13 September
- 1953: 3–5,7–10 September back to 7-day show
- 1954: 9–11,13–16 September
