= George Dowling (wool expert) =

Wool broker in Australia

George Dowling (c. 1854 – 19 August 1950) was a wool broker in South Australia.

== History ==
Dowling was born in Dublin, Ireland, and attended the City of London Public School, then at 12 years of age began an apprenticeship with Willans, Overbury. & Co., wool and skin brokers and merchants of London and before he turned 21 was selling wool on the floors of the London Wool Exchange. He remained with Willans, Overbury, for 15 years. On the day he became a wool auctioneer he purchased an ivory auctioneer's hammer. It remained his trademark for over 50 years, knocking down millions of pounds' worth of wool in Britain and Australia.

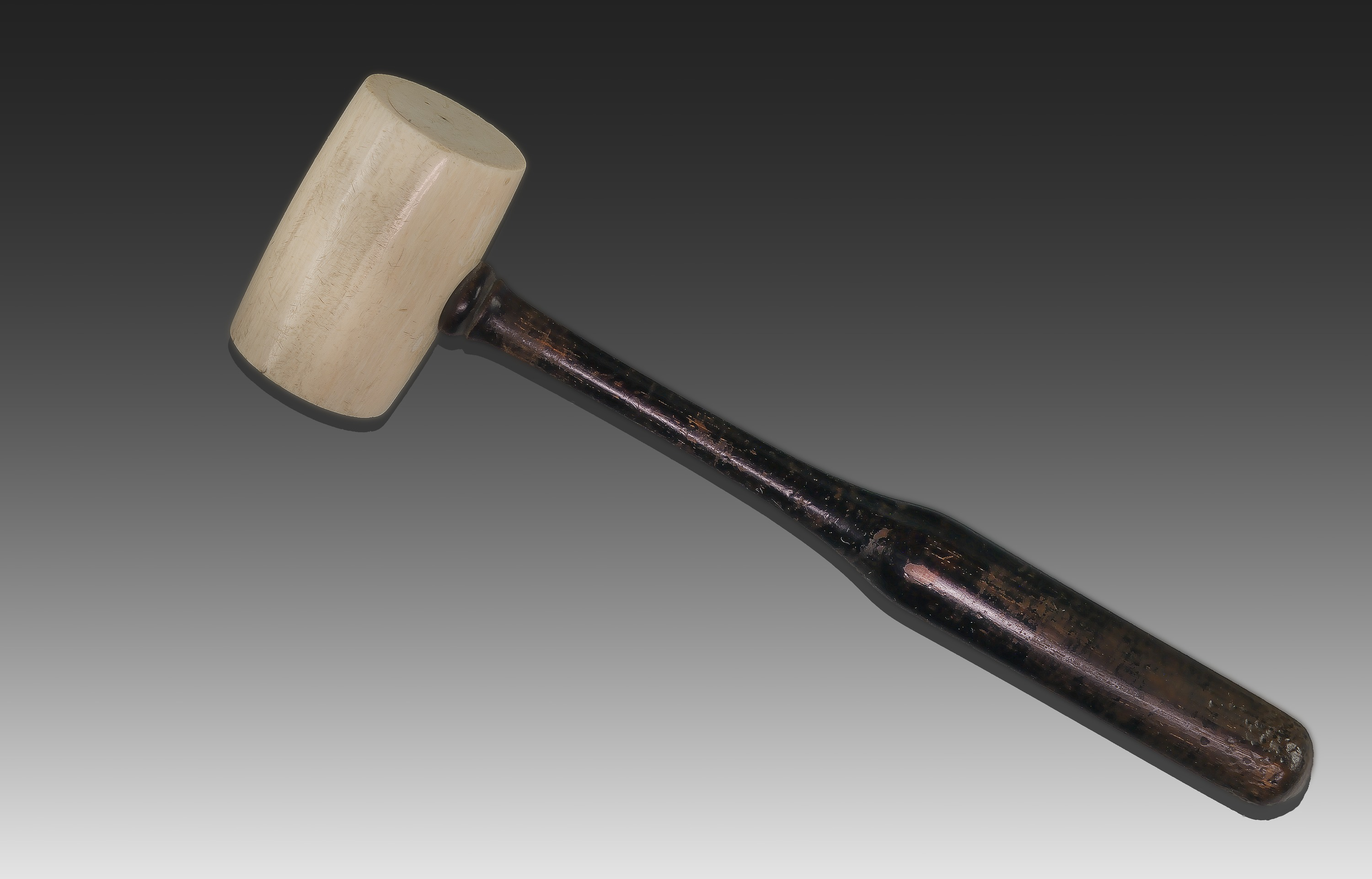
An early gavel or auctioneer's hammer

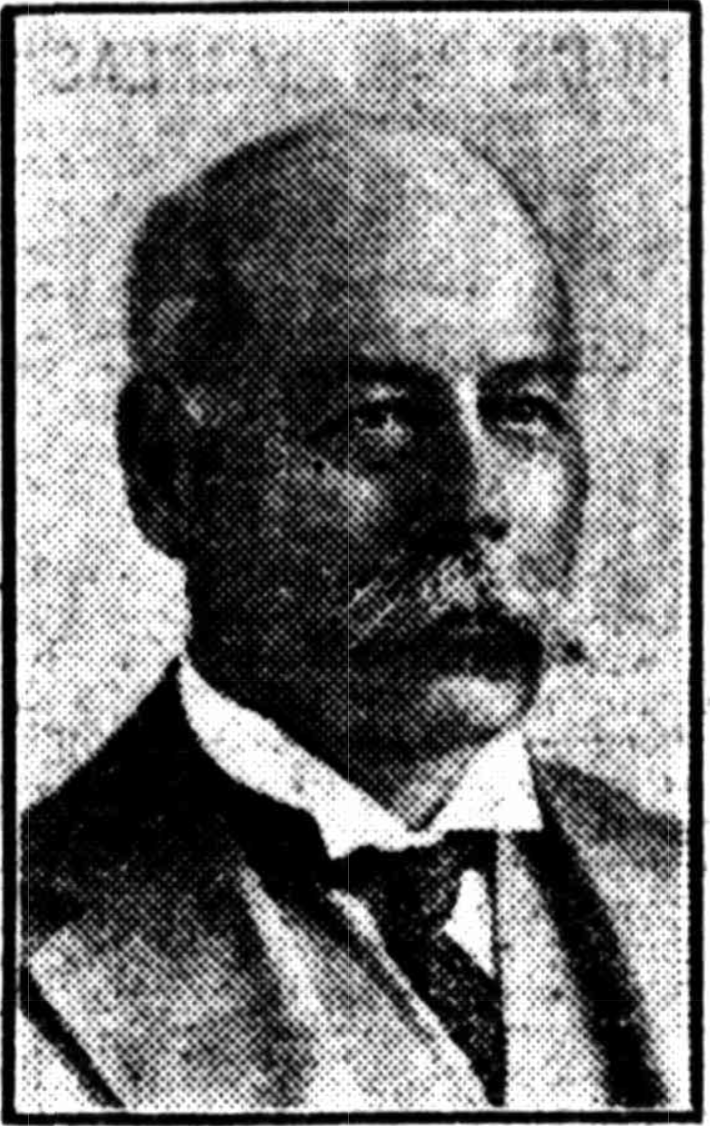
George Dowling

He was engaged by Luxmoore & Co. of South Australia as their wool expert, and arrived in Adelaide May 19 1883 by the steamer John Elder, having left London on 6 April. Over the years he acquired an interest in the business, admitted to the board in 1889. In 1906 it became Luxmoore, Dowling & Jeffrey, wool, hide, skin, tallow and grain brokers, becoming co-manager with George Jeffrey. In 1907 the firm amalgamated with Bagot, Shakes & Lewis (founded 1888), with Dowling and Jeffrey as joint managers of their wool department for the next 16 or 17 years. In June 1924 Jeffrey left and the company was absorbed by Goldsbrough Mort & Co. of Sydney, with Dowling as manager of the wool department. Dowling regularly conducted their wool auctions until 1927 when he retired and Spencer Williams became their wool expert.

Dowling was founding (1886) secretary of the Adelaide Wool and Skin Brokers Association, later renamed Adelaide Woolbrokers' Association, and in 1895 was elected president, a position he retained for nearly 30 years.

== Family ==
Dowling married Helen Roake (c. 1864 – 14 July 1937) on 19 May 1885. Their family included

- Terence George Dowling (1886 – 1966) married Fanny Doris Watson in 1920, lived in Waikerie. Their son Terence Eric Dowling (12 April 1922 – 18 March 1944), air gunner with RAAF and RAF, was shot down over Germany.
- Eileen Kathleen Dowling (29 June 1891 – )
- Eric Roake Dowling (1894 – 22 August 1973) He fought with the 3rd Light Horse in the First AIF and survived Gallipoli. He married Dove Power of Jugiong on 22 March 1932 and settled at Rothesay Station, Young, New South Wales.

Both sons had Soldier Settlement blocks at Waikerie.

- Kathleen Jessie Dowling (30 September 1899 – )

Their home for many years was 28 Dequetteville Terrace, Kent Town, but Dowling died aged 96 at the home of his daughter Eileen, in Sydney. In an earlier interview, he attributed his good health in old age to being a non-smoker and only a moderate drinker. Lawn bowls was his chosen sport and gardening his recreation in later years.
