= Albert Molineux =

Australian agriculture journalist

Albert Molineux (11 July 1832 – 6 June 1909) was a pioneer of South Australia agriculture and fishing. He encouraged use of artificial fertilizers based on research, and the promulgation of scientific advice by bureaux. He was a journalist for the South Australian Register and longtime agriculture editor for its sister publication The Adelaide Observer.

== History ==
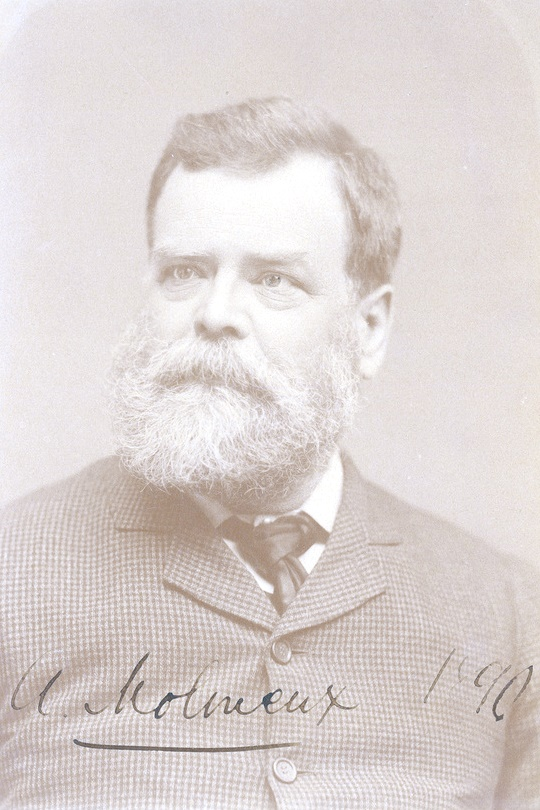
Albert Molineux

Molineux was born in Brighton, England, to Martha (c. 1809 – 23 March 1882) and Edward Molineux ( – 30 May 1876), and left for South Australia at six years of age with his parents in the barque Resource, arriving in January 1839, and for a year lived on Buffalo Row. (Note: Buffalo Row, the camping ground for a hundred or so immigrants by that ship, was established in 1837 on the north-west park lands, between the Port Road and the River Torrens, opposite the site of the future Adelaide Gaol. Light's survey camp (from Rapid and Cygnet), established in 1836, was nearby; Coromandel Row (named for the ship) followed in 1837, then Immigration Square, where the government established fifty-odd wooden huts by the Torrens at Thebarton from 1840.) His father was a bootmaker who hoped to make a living at his trade, but was forced by circumstances to take a position at the makeshift prison behind Government House. They later had a farm on the River Gilbert, near Riverton.

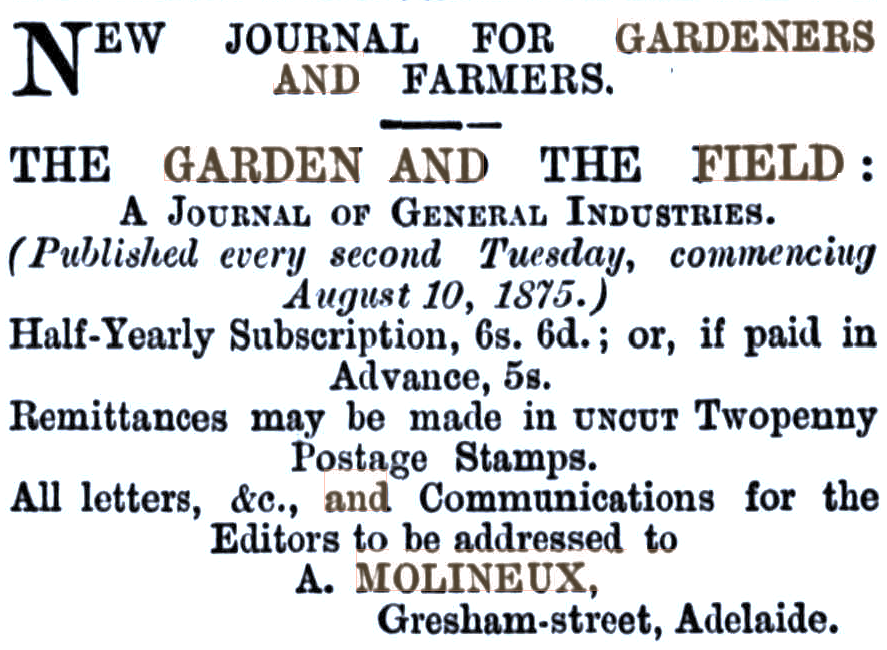
Advert in The Australasian Sketcher

His first employment on leaving school was on a farm at Klemzig, after which he was apprenticed as a compositor to George Dehane. In 1851 he joined the great exodus to the goldfields of Bendigo, where he made a modest living, after which he took up farming in the region of Riverton. He began contributing to the gardening pages of the Adelaide newspapers, and in 1875 he established the magazine The Garden and the Field, as a successor to Edward William Andrews' The Farm and Garden. The venture was successful, and he developed a devoted readership, continuing as editor until around 1893, when he accepted the position of general secretary to the Central Agricultural Bureau. He helped develop tomato growing in South Australia, also oyster harvesting, having developed a trawl net for studying their habits. In 1890 Molyneux and J. Orchard presented a paper "Harvesting of Wheat Crops" to the Agricultural Bureau Congress.

He retired from the public service in 1902 and was appointed to the Council of Agriculture, and its successor, the Advisory Board of Agriculture, where his wealth of knowledge and experience was appreciated by practical farmers.

He was prominent in urging development of forests for future timber requirements. He was an advocate for the use of fertilsers, fallowing, and mixed farming. He recommended Bordeaux mixture to prevent fungus diseases such as scab in apples and pears and shothole in apricots; and arsenical sprays to combat codlin moth.

== Recognition ==
In 1891, Molineux was elected a Fellow of the Linnean Society of London in recognition of his work on Echidna hystrix and a "new marsupial". He had some years earlier been elected Fellow of the Royal Horticultural Society of England.

In 1909 the Advisory Board of Agriculture resolved to establish a permanent "Albert Molineux Scholarship" at Roseworthy Agricultural College.

In 1988 a new breed of wheat resistant to "eelworm" (cereal cyst nematode — CCN), developed by Tony Rathjen and Dr Alan Dube of Waite Institute, was named Molineux in his honor.

== Family ==
Molineux married Mary Ann Harris (c. 1830 – 29 December 1890) on 7 March 1861. They had one son:

- Albert Edward Molineux (21 August 1862 – December 1922) married Minnie Nicholas ( – ) in 1897

He married again, to Eliza Ingham ( – 30 August 1898) on 21 August 1897. She had two adult daughters, Mrs H. Dyer and Mrs A. S. Lilburne.

His siblings include

- Edward Molineux (c. 1833 – 5 October 1902)
- Leonard Molineux (1834 – 1 January 1893)
- Augustus Leppard Molineux (1 July 1843 – 1 March 1907) married Janie Main on 30 August 1884
- William John Molineux ( – 17 January 1901) married Mary Ann O'Connell on 29 January 1890
- Eugene Leppard Molineux (c. 1842 – 18 December 1913)
- Blanche Annette Leppard Molineux (1851 – 22 September 1911) married John H. Champness on 7 March 1876
