= Joseph Albert Riley =

South Australian businessman (1869 – 1940)

Joseph Albert Riley (1869 – 6 January 1940), invariably referred to as "J. A. Riley", was a prominent South Australian businessman, and longtime organising secretary of several South Australian institutions.

Born at Bilton, Warwickshire, he emigrated at an early age with his parents to South Australia. He was educated at Pulteney Grammar School and found employment in the office of John Creswell, whom he assisted in his many activities and positions, several of which he filled when Creswell died.

== Activities ==
- Manager of National Insurance Company
- active member of Odfellows and Recording Secretary of the Loyal Albion Lodge
- Secretary of the Plympton Coursing Club 1895 (John Creswell was director)
- Secretary of the South Australian Coursing Club
- Secretary of Royal Agricultural and Horticultural Society 1909–1925 It was during his incumbency that the Wayville Showgrounds were inaugurated.
- Secretary of the South Australian Cricket Association
- member of the Adelaide Chamber of Commerce for 50 years (1887–1937) and Secretary for 29. He was active in the formation of the Associated Chambers of Commerce.
- Secretary of the South Australian Vinegrowers Association
- member of St. Peter's Old Collegians and the St. Peter's Lodge.

== Recognition ==
- He was awarded the OBE for his work in fundraising during the Great War.
- He was awarded the King Albert Medal for his work in assisting Belgian refugees.

== Family ==
He married Agnes Christina Davidson Sketheway (died 3 September 1945), a daughter of the president of South Adelaide Football Club; they had two children:

Eva Agnes Riley (died 24 July 1952) married John George Edge (died 31 October 1931) of Mount Guide station, Queensland, on 22 January 1919.
W. Norman Riley of Toorak, who played cricket for East Torrens and played several games for South Australia

Their home was "Sunnybrae", 133 Park Terrace (later Greenhill Road), Wayville
