= Creswell Gardens =

Park in North Adelaide, South Australia

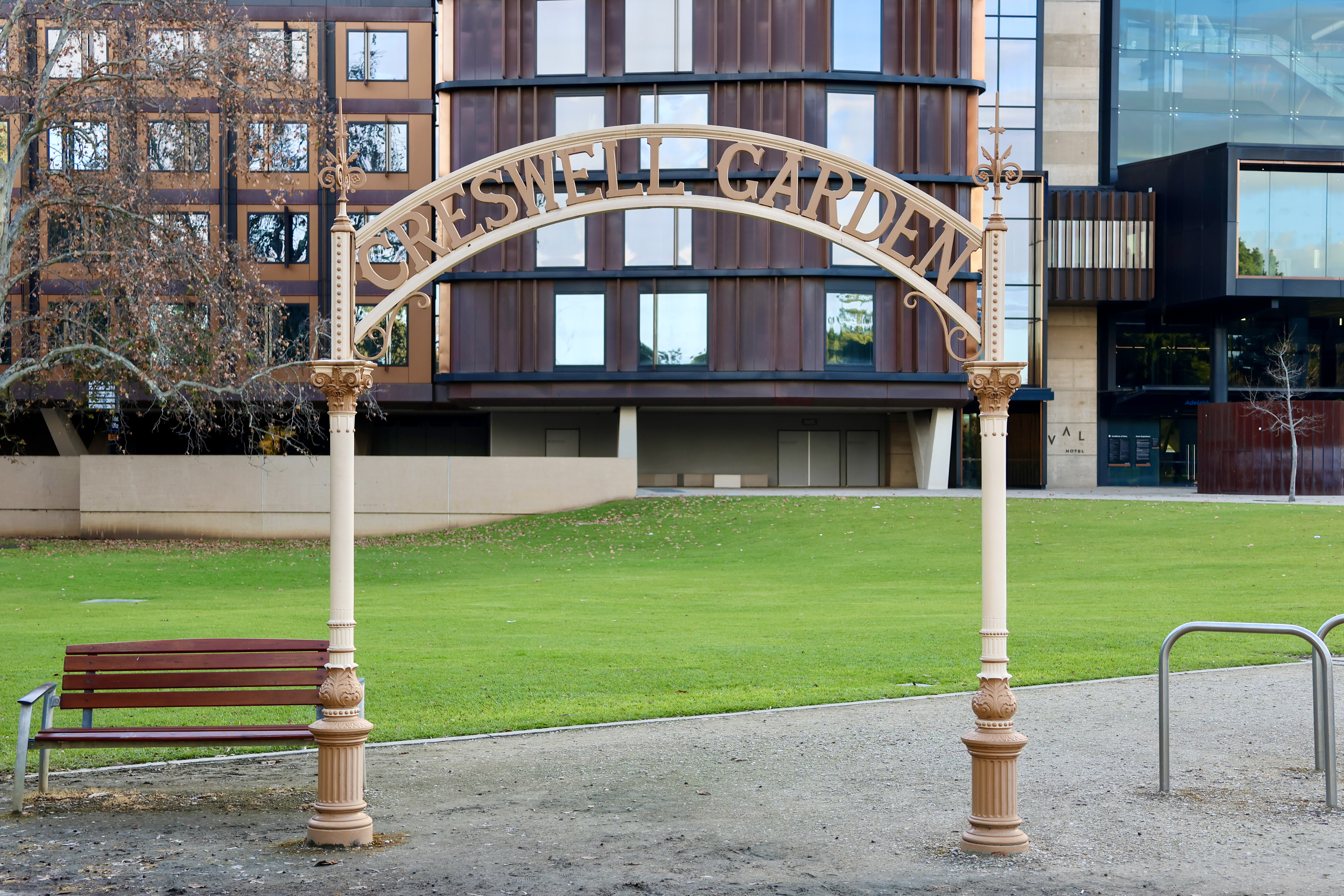
- Creswell Gardens gate in 2026
- Interactive map of Creswell Gardens
- Type: Public gardens
- Location: North Adelaide, South Australia, Australia
- Coordinates: 34.9156°S 138.5983°E
- Established: 1909
- Designer: August Wilhelm Pelzer
- Etymology: John Creswell
- Operator: City of Adelaide

The Creswell Gardens are located in the Adelaide Park Lands between the Adelaide Oval, War Memorial Drive, King William Road and St Peter's Cathedral. They were established in 1909 and named after South Australian sportsman John Creswell. The gardens contain a number of Adelaide's landmark features.

The gardens have been rearranged many times during their history; probably the only constants since the 1920s are the WWI Memorial Oak Tree and the statue of Sir Ross Smith. An undated aerial photo of the gardens (circa 2014) can be found on page 5 of the South Australian Heritage Council's description of The War Memorial Oak tree. Since then there have been significant changes to the Adelaide Oval eastern stands and many associated changes to the layout of the gardens.

The State Library of South Australia has several collections of photos of the area, dating from 1916, showing how as the surrounding roads and footpaths have increased in size, the area has changed from a rambling garden with a summer house and a southern boundary of the River Torrens to an area of lawn and large trees.

== War Memorial Oak tree ==
The War Memorial Oak tree was planted on 29 August 1914 about 25 metres from War Memorial Drive. By 2014 the tree had a canopy approximately 30 metres in diameter, and a life expectancy of 500 years. The tree, and a plaque immediately adjacent to the base of the tree (c.1917), are both heritage listed. The plaque states: "The War Memorial Oak planted by His Excellency the Governor Sir Henry Galway on Wattle Day August 29th 1914."

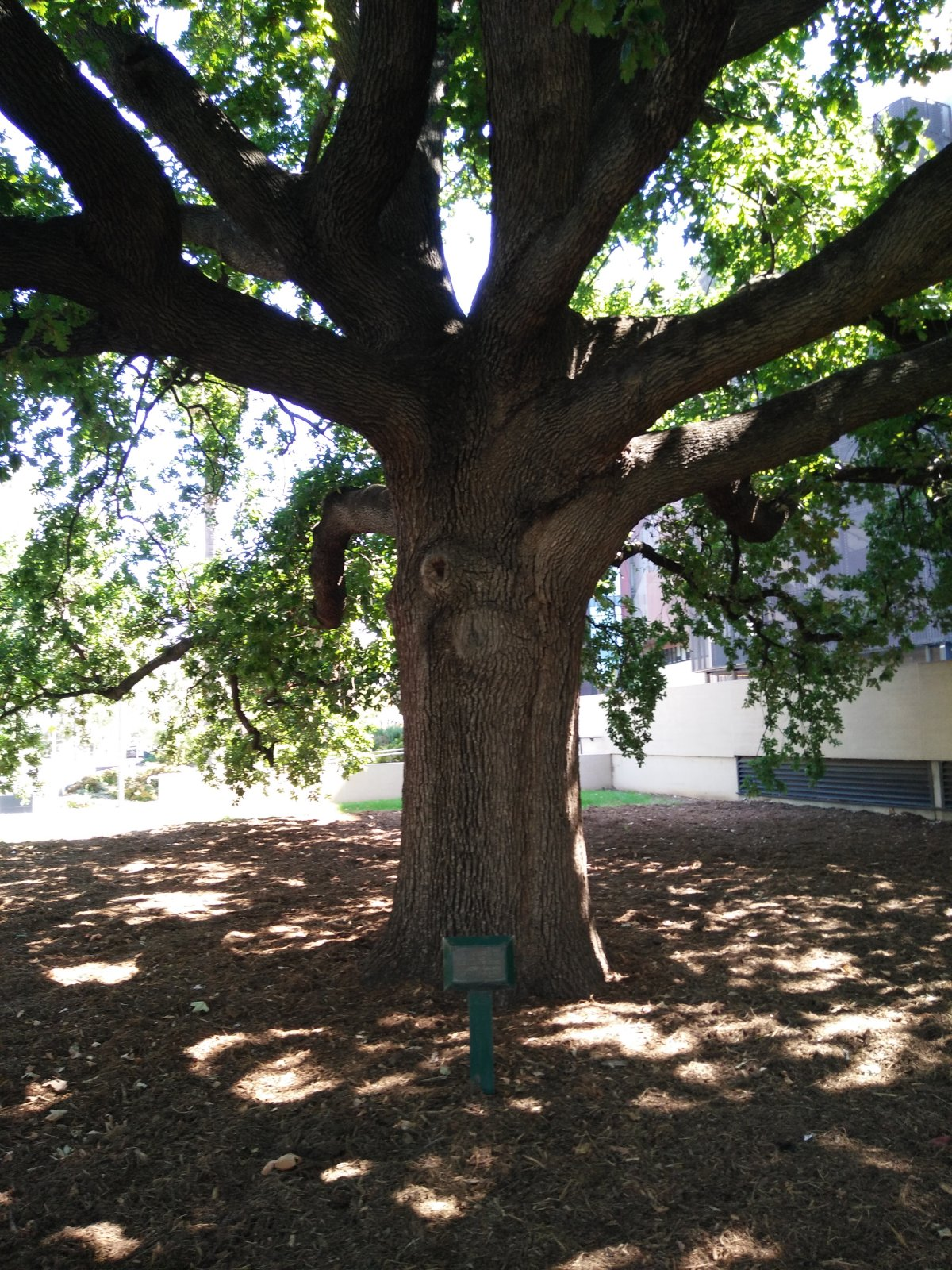
c.2017

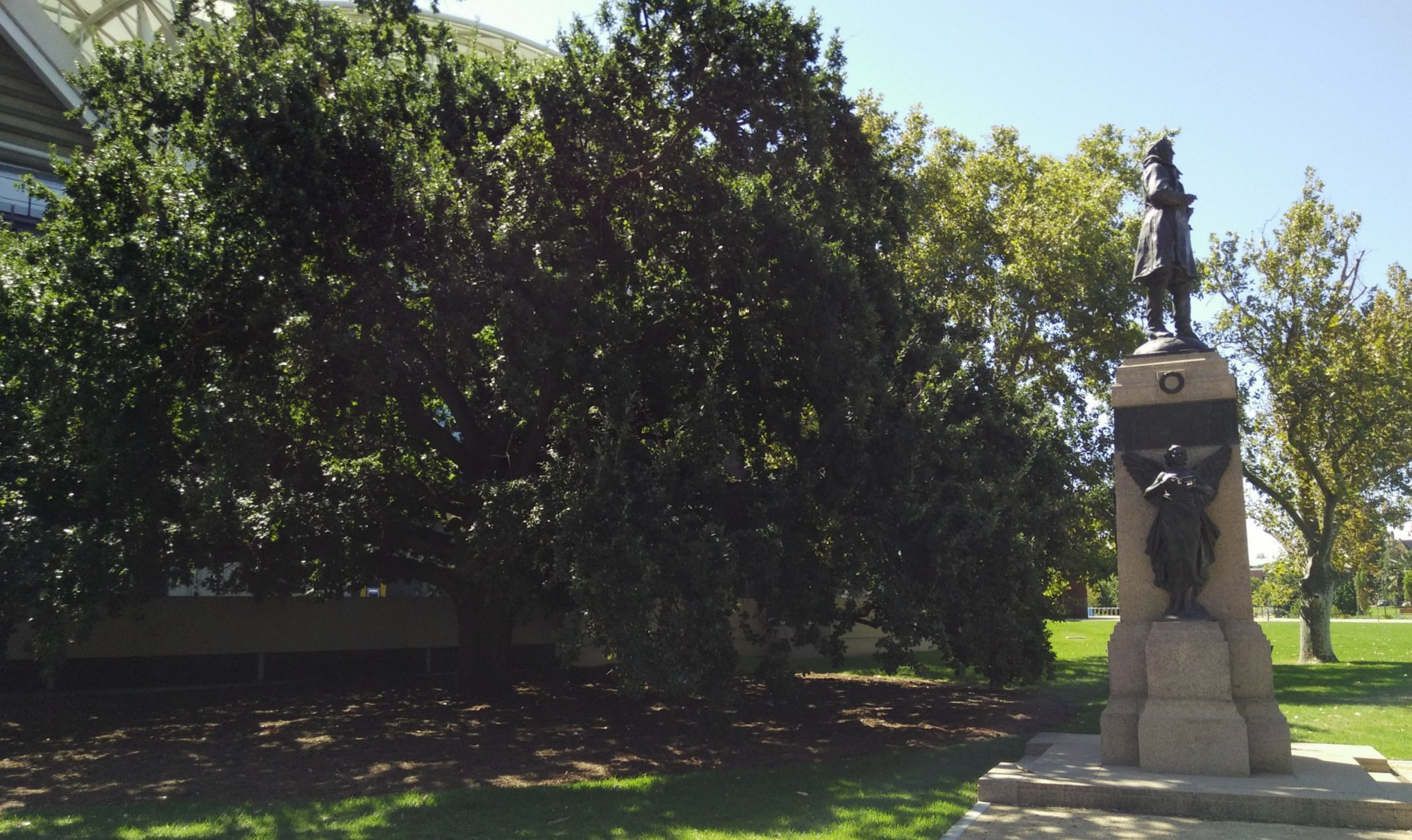
Looking north c.2017

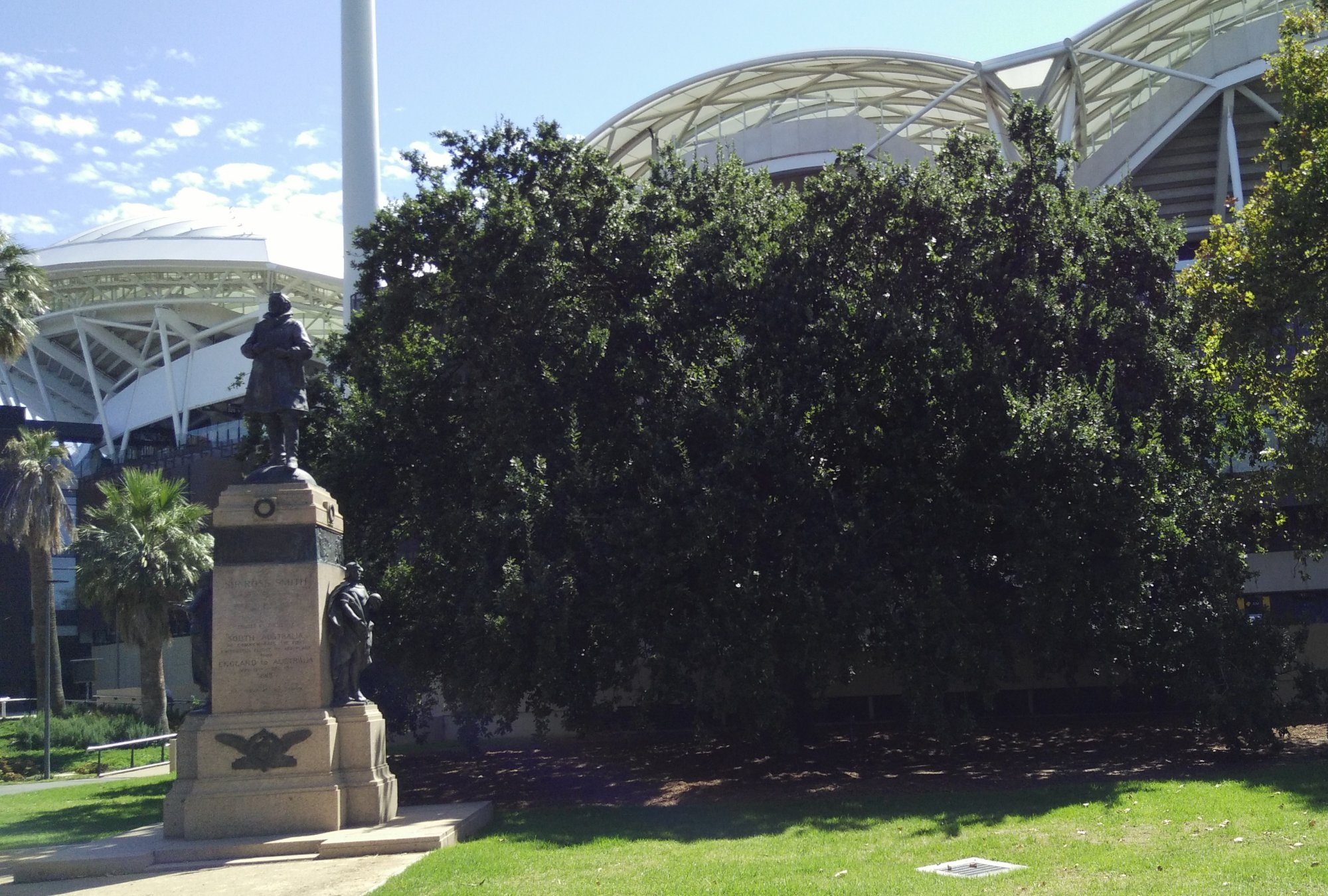
Looking west c.2017

== Sir Ross Smith Memorial ==
About 20 metres south-east of the oak tree trunk stands a memorial to Sir Ross Macpherson Smith, KBE, MC & Bar, DFC & Two Bars, AFC (1892–1922). In 1919, he and brother Keith, Jim Bennett and Wally Shiers were the first to fly from England to Australia. Ross Smith and Bennett were killed when a plane they were testing crashed in England on 13 April 1922.

The bronze statue stands on a red granite plinth which features bronze bas-relief work depicting aeroplanes and various symbols. The sculptor was Frederick Brook Hitch who won a competition to design this statue. The 26 feet (7.9 m) tall memorial was funded by public donations to a "shilling fund" opened by the Lord Mayor of Adelaide.

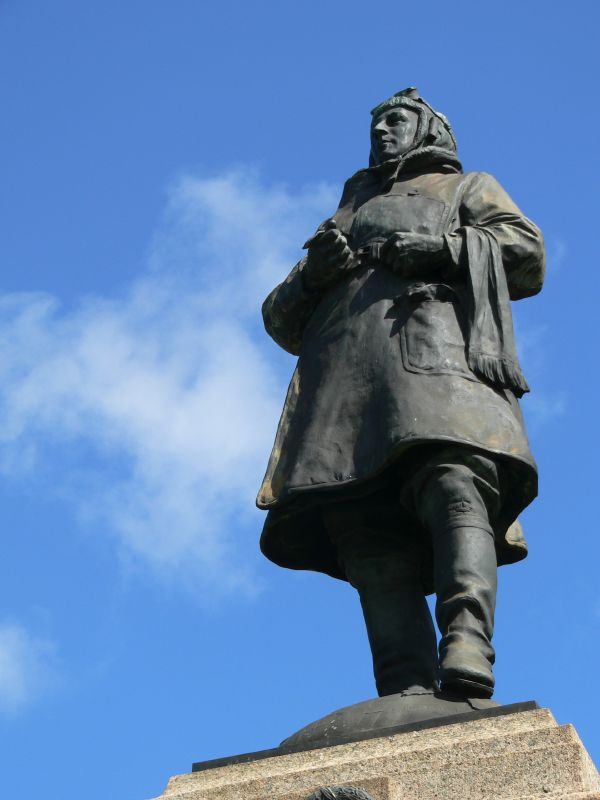

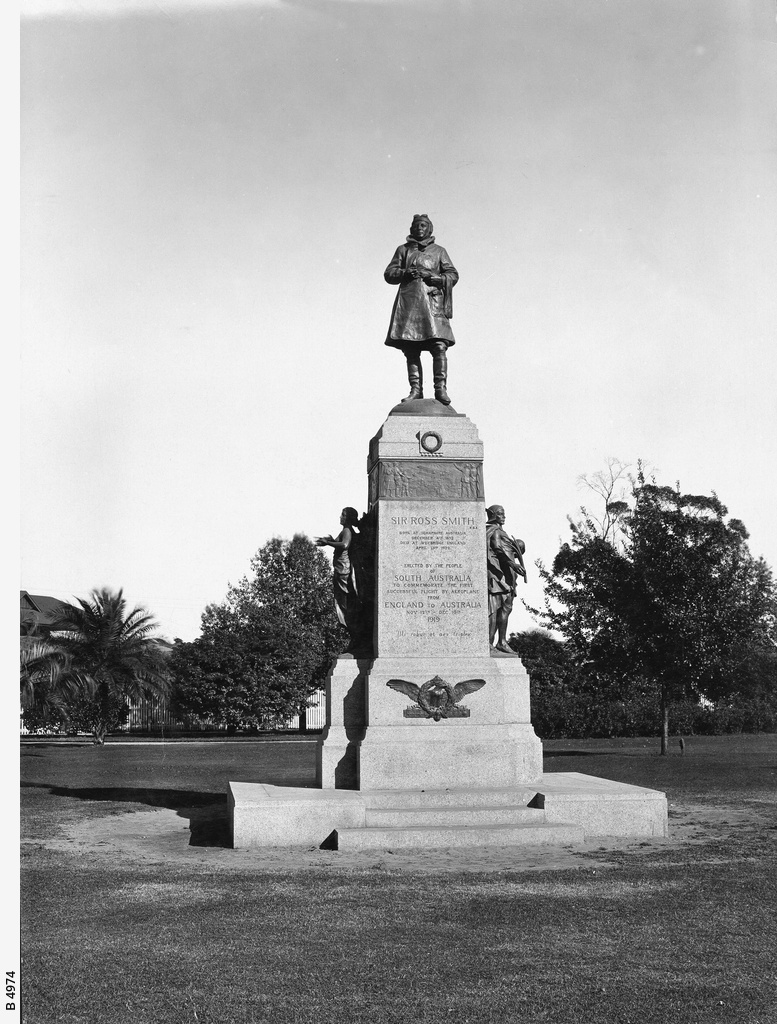

== Creswell Gardens Fountain ==
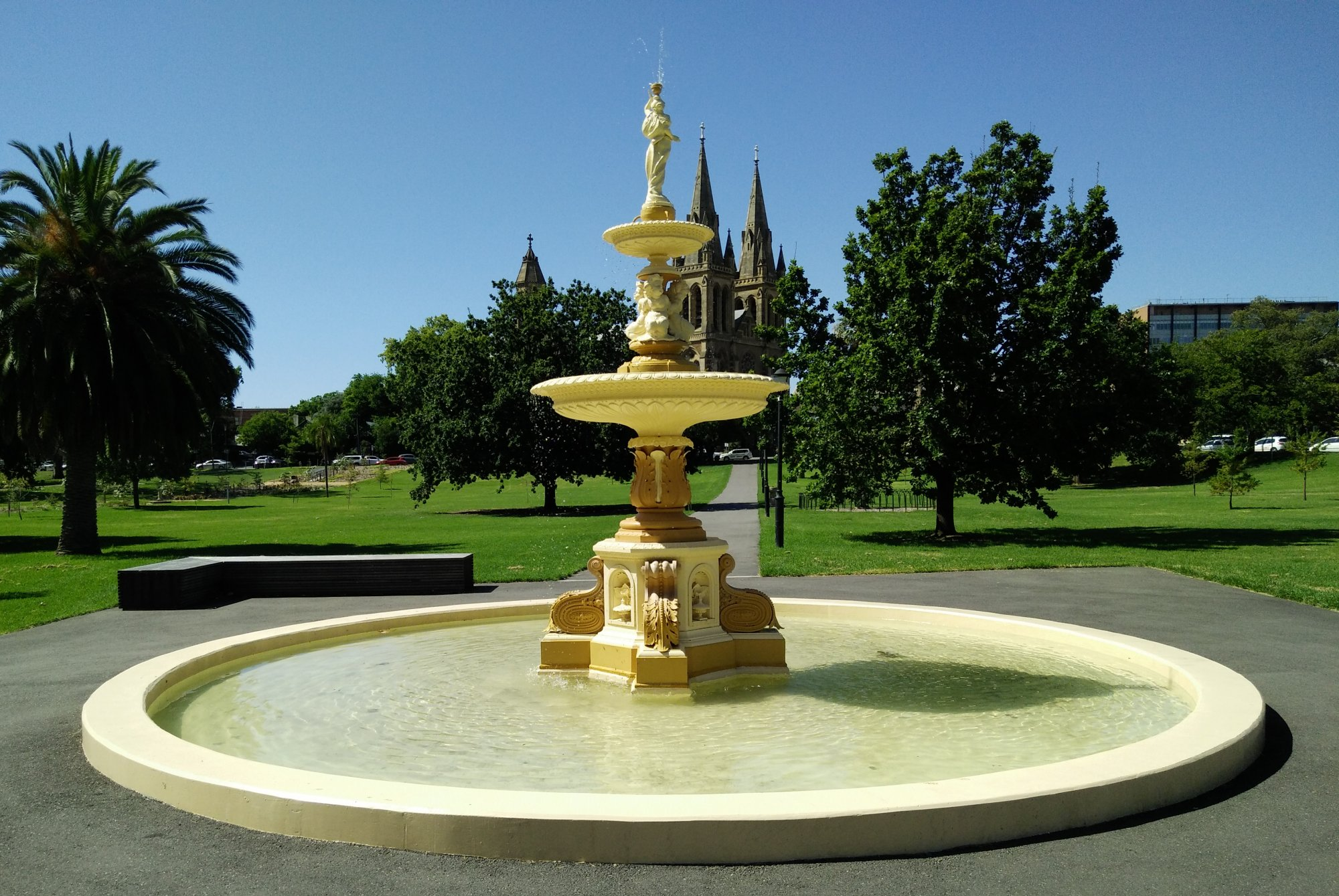
Creswell Gardens Fountain

Prior to Adelaide Oval eastern stand developments, the fountain was located about 50 metres north of the oak tree. It was originally located on North Terrace in front of the long since demolished Jubilee Exhibition Building. It is now located further north-east.

== Victor Richardson Road and Gates ==
Prior to Adelaide Oval eastern stand developments, the gardens were bisected by Victor Richardson Road which led to John Dowie's Victor Richardson gates. The gates have now been moved to a position south-west of the oak tree, a new East gate has been incorporated into the Eastern stands structure, and the road is now the entrance to the Oval's underground car park.

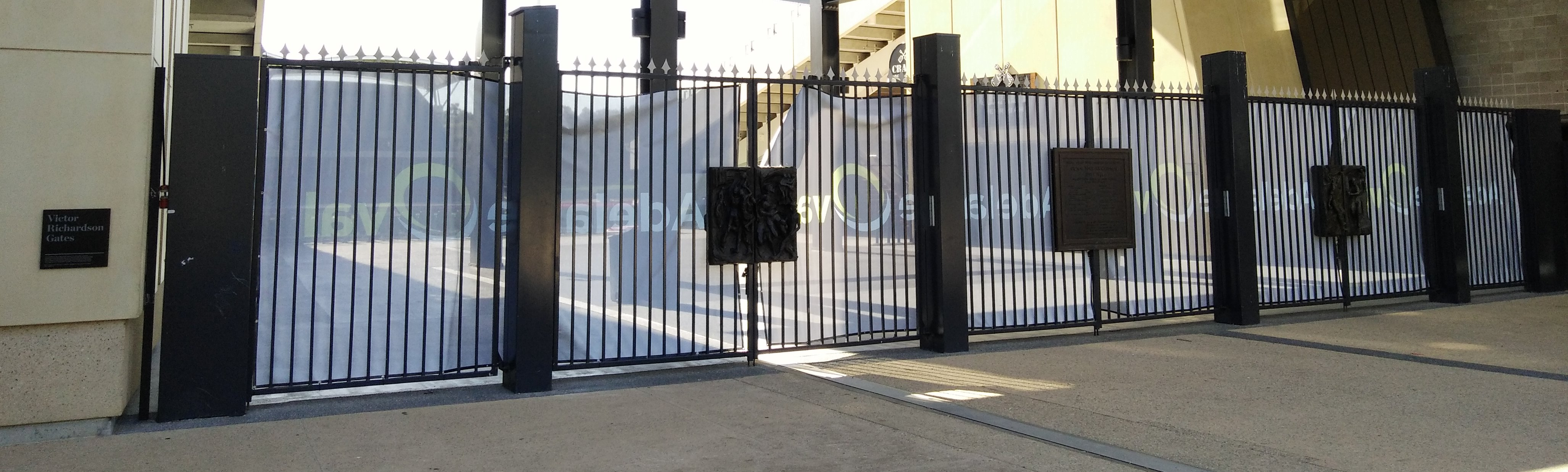
The Gates

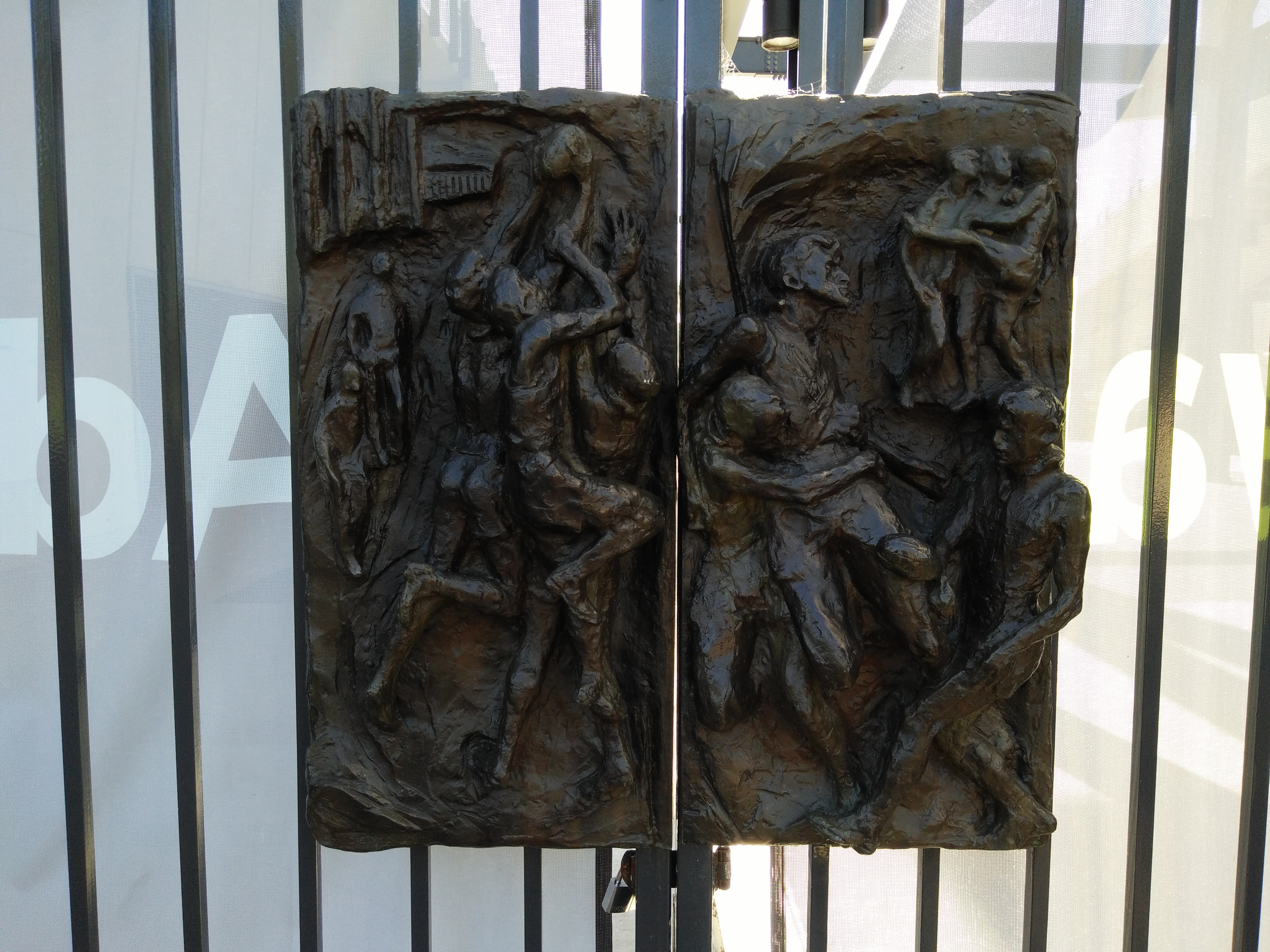
Football

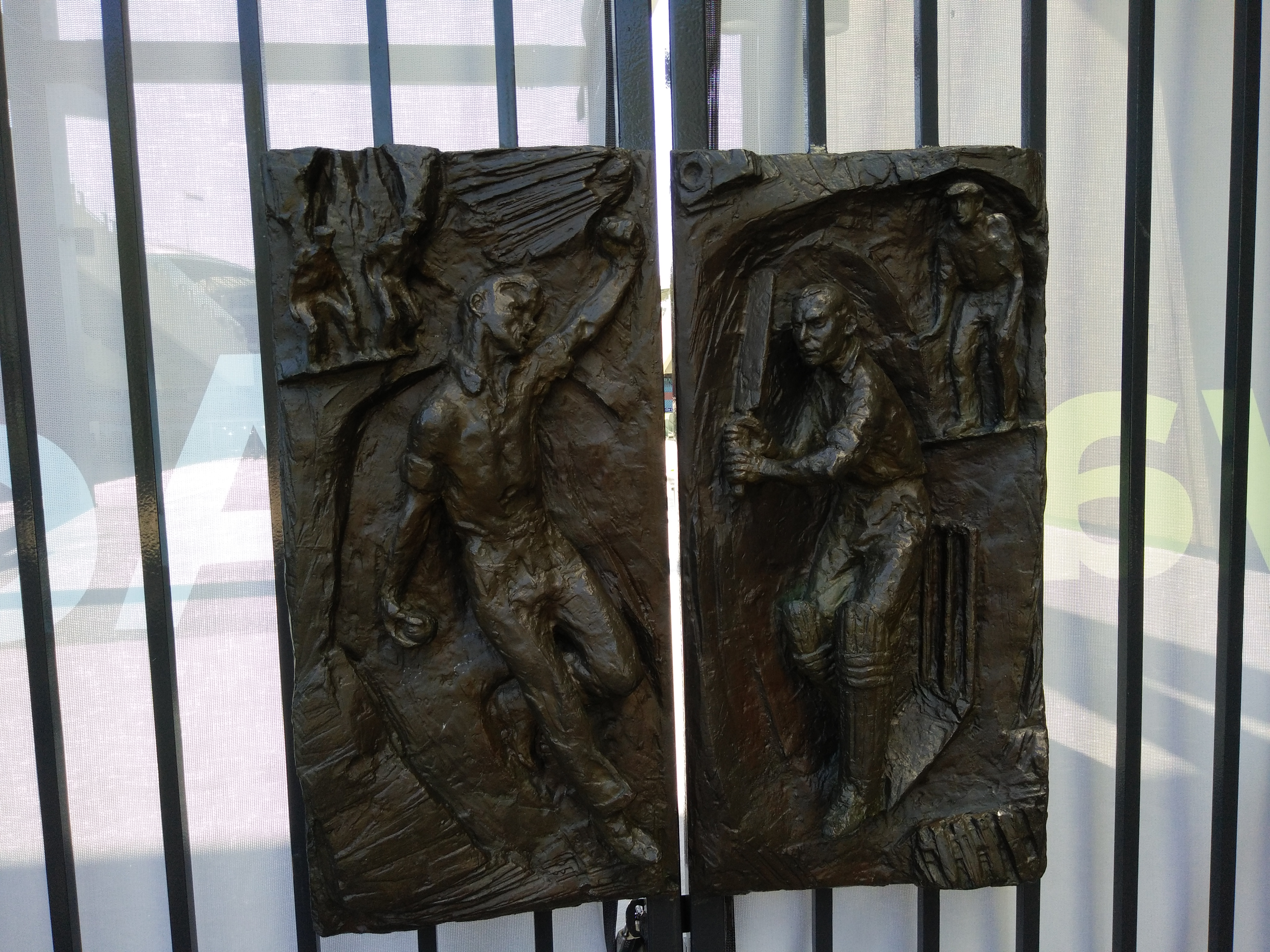
Cricket

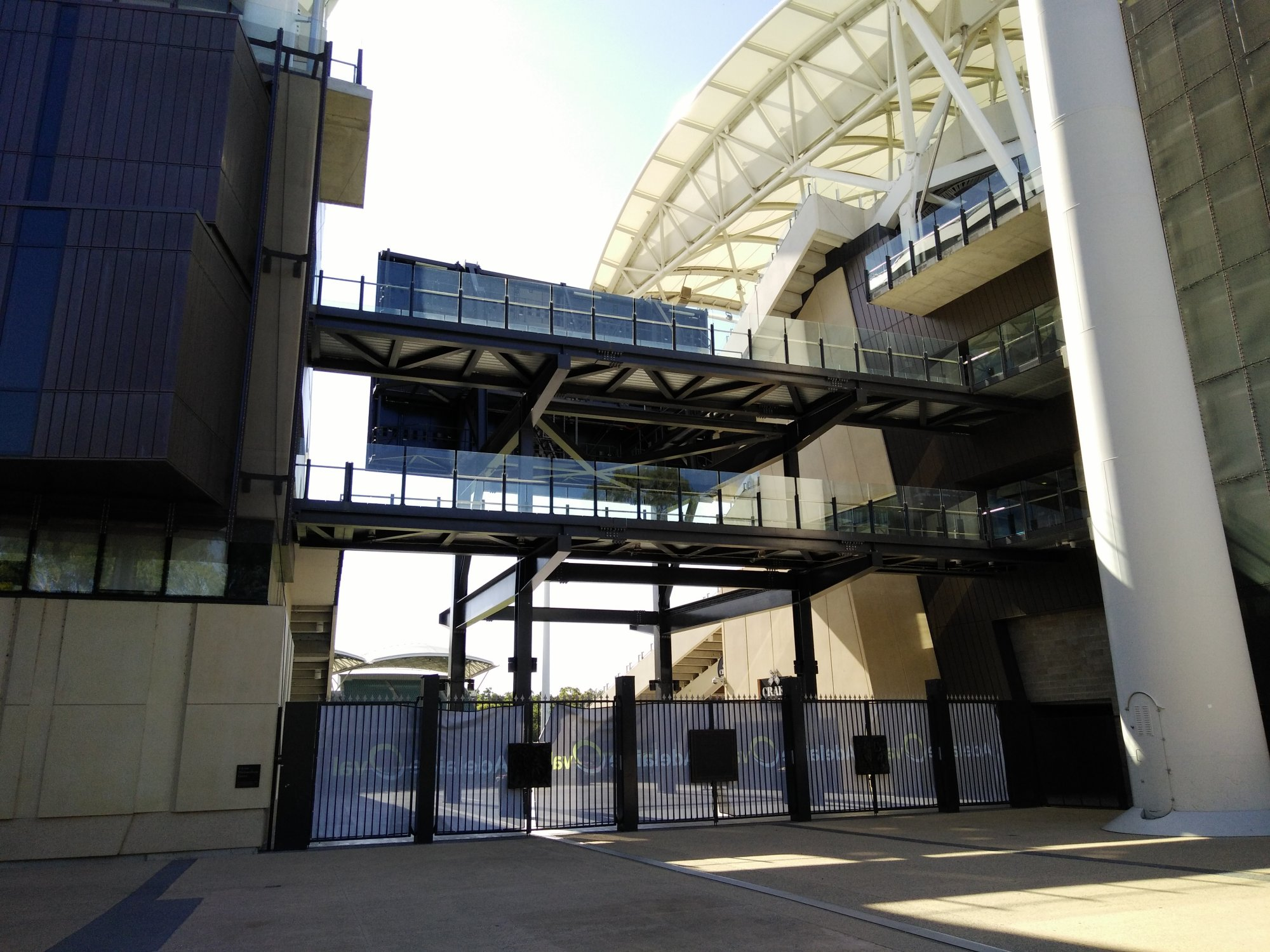
Gates now dwarfed between and beneath the south and east stands

== Sir Donald Bradman ==
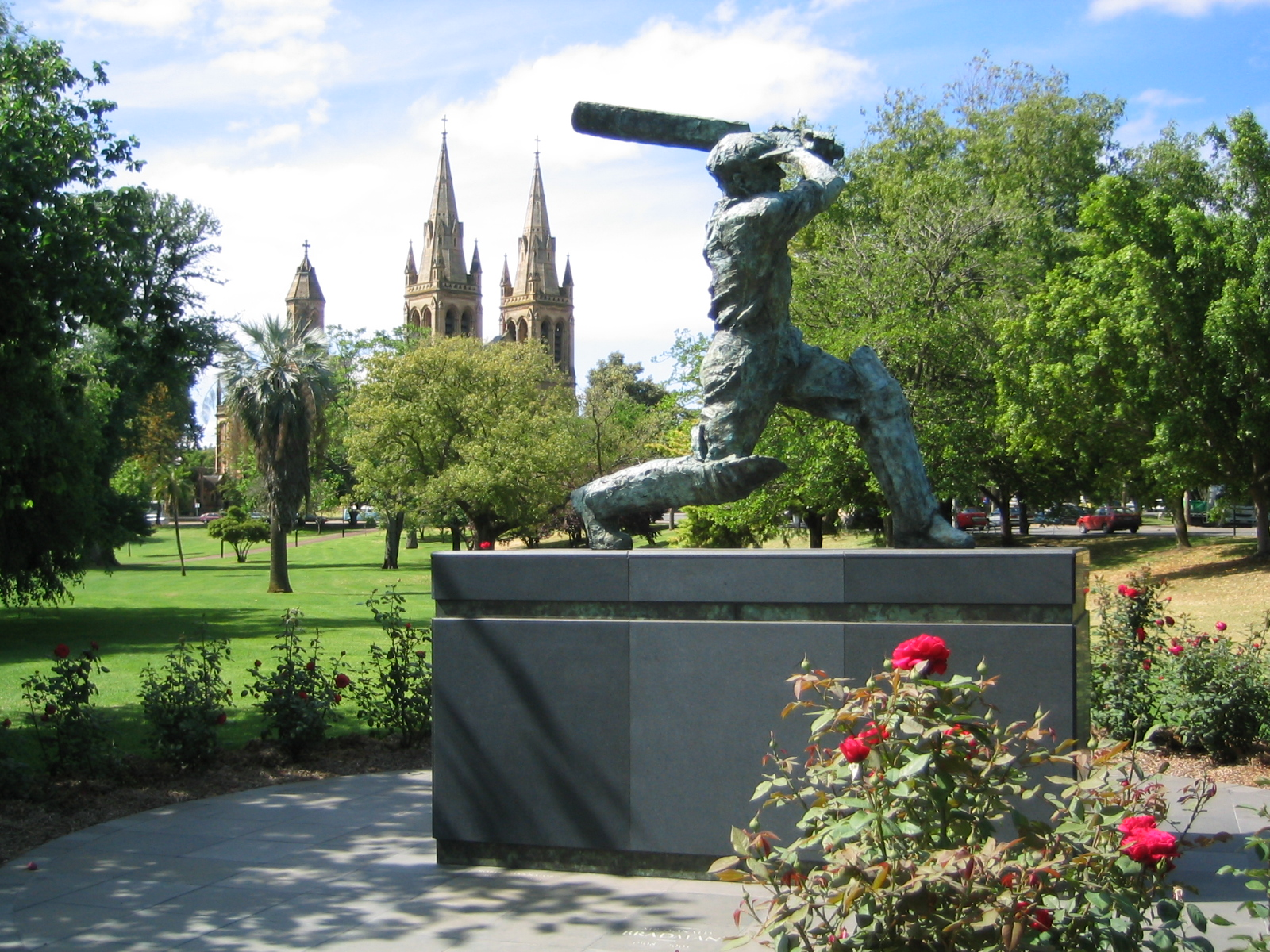
Sir Donald Bradman by Robert Hannaford

A statue of Sir Donald Bradman by Robert Hannaford completed and placed in 1998 remains just north of what is now the underground car park entrance road.
