= John Creswell (sportsman) =

Australian businessman, sportsman & sport administrator (1858-1909)

John Creswell (8 December 1858 – 24 March 1909) was a South Australian businessman chiefly remembered for his contribution to the sports of cricket and Australian rules football, but who made his mark in various other fields in a short but vigorous life.

== History ==
John was born in Woodville, South Australia, the son of John Thomas Creswell (ca.1815 – 24 August 1874) and Mary Ann (née Smith), a pioneer of Port Adelaide, and was educated at St Peter's College, Adelaide. He joined the accounting firm of F. S. C. Driffield, which he took over on the death of Driffield. He was an enthusiastic and competent cricketer, an exponent of lawn bowls and one of the founders of the South Australian Football Association in 1876 and represented South Australia in inter-colonial matches. In 1893 he stood for the Southern District seat in the Legislative Council of South Australia but was decisively beaten by the incumbent J. H. Gordon.

He was Adelaide's manager for the National Fire and Marine Insurance Company of New Zealand, which frequently took him to that country.

He was also:

- An enthusiast for the sport or pastime of coursing, founding president of the Plympton Coursing Club and member of the South Australian Coursing Association, which held meetings at Buckland Park. At least one of his dogs was a winner of the (South Australian) Waterloo Cup.
- Secretary of the Royal Agricultural and Horticultural Society of South Australia from 1880 and credited with the increase in popularity of its Autumn and Spring Shows.
- Secretary of the South Australian Cricket Association from 1883
- Secretary of the South Park Football Club (SAFA) in 1879
- Secretary of the South Australia Football Association - As a player he represented the State in intercolonial matches
- Secretary of the Adelaide Chamber of Commerce
- Secretary of the Vinegrowers' Association of South Australia
- Secretary of Eastern and African Cool Storage Company
- Secretary of the Farmers' Distress Fund
- representative for South Australia on the English Board of Trade
- chairman of the St Peter's Collegians' Association
- member of the board of governors of St Peter's College from 1892 and its president from 1900

Of these, the Agricultural Society position at least was salaried; amounting to £400 per annum in 1902, with £165 as a commission, though he had to pay for clerical assistance from this amount. He was also supplied with an office which he was free to use for other business.

He succeeded in several of his secretarial positions with his business associate J. A. Riley.

== Character ==
Creswell was described as a man of cheerful disposition. Despite his many interests he was able to fill each reliably, more than competently, and he was capable of infecting others with a similar enthusiasm and confidence in a successful outcome. He was described as a man of exceptional probity. His organising ability and good luck were dubbed legendary with many viewing the fact that Creswell was on a committee was practically a guarantee of success. He was courteous, unselfish and considerate according to others.

== Family ==
John's eldest sister, Mary Ann Sarah Creswell, married William Francis Everard, son of Charles John Everard (1821–1892) and grandson of Charles George Everard of Ashford, on 29 December 1881.

John married Elizabeth Maria "Lillie" Kingsborough (ca.1860 – 26 September 1927) on 4 June 1884. They had a son and four daughters:

- eldest daughter (7 May 1885 – )
- Hazel (21 December 1886 – ) married Ralph Newland, son of Simpson Newland on 7 June 1909
- John (28 May 1891 – ) married ? Moorhouse on 10 February 1926
- Katrine Thornton (16 April 1895 – ) married Geoffrey Hardman Howard on 30 April 1925
- Jean Thornton (29 July 1897 – ) engaged to Owen Kyffin Thomas, son of Sir Robert Kyffin Thomas

== Death and recognition ==
Creswell suffered an apoplectic stroke following a brain hemorrhage, and died the same day at his home in High Street, Unley Park.

- The John Creswell Stand at Adelaide Oval was named in his honour. That stand was replaced with the Sir Donald Bradman stand in 1990. This was in turn demolished in April 2012.
- Creswell Gardens, originally named Creswell Park, on King William Road adjacent to the Adelaide Oval, was named for him. (Creswell Park, on Stephen Terrace, Gilberton, was named in honour of his son, John Creswell jun., who was a chairman of the Walkerville District Council from 1938 to 1943, and a councillor for 17 years.)
- The Creswell Cup, for presentation at Shows, was named in his memory by the Royal Agricultural and Horticultural Society.
- The Creswell Trophy for wheat was also awarded at Adelaide Shows
- The Creswell Cup for plumpton coursing at Plympton was inaugurated in 1910 and continued until at least 1925.
- A scholarship in commerce was founded in his name at the University of Adelaide.
- Prince Alfred College awards a Creswell memorial scholarship in his memory.
- A portrait, by George Alfred John Webb, was hung in the Members' Room at Adelaide Oval.
