= H. Dawson & Co. =

H. Dawson & Co., also known as HD Wool, is a world-wide firm of wool dealers, based in Bradford, England.

== History ==
The company was founded as Henry Dawson and Co. in 1888 by Harry Dawson, sourcing merino wool from Australia, and other grades from sources world-wide. The name of the company became Henry Dawson and Sons, Ltd.

Dawson was President of the British Wool Federation from 1920, or earlier, to 1928. and succeeded by William Hunter.

The company was still active in the early 21st-century, led by the founder's great-grandson Jo Dawson. They closed their Australian office in 2007, but re-opened in 2013.
