= Edward William Andrews =

Australian newspaper editor

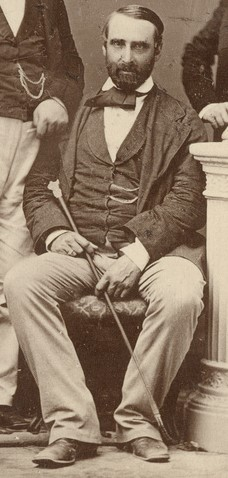

Edward William Andrews (17 May 1812 – 23 February 1877) was a newspaper editor in the early days of the Colony of South Australia.

He was the eldest son of Rev. Edward Andrews, LL.D., a Congregationalist minister of Walworth, London, and started life as a merchant, eventually becoming a member of the London Stock Exchange. He and his family migrated to South Australia on the Anna Robertson, arriving in Adelaide on 20 September 1839.

== Business ==
In December 1839 he helped found the South Australian Insurance Joint Stock Company, and early in 1840 founded the firm of Gorton & Andrews, merchants. He had a close personal and business relationship with James Frew (for whom Frewville is named) of Frew & Company. Andrews was declared insolvent in 1843 and the company was declared insolvent in 1846.

In 1841 Andrews became a Director of the Marine Fire and Life Insurance Company.

In 1850 or thereabouts, Andrews joined the staff of The South Australian newspaper, then joined the staff of the Register shortly after the death of John Stephens. After having been run for some time by John Taylor, the Register and its weekly sister publication, The Adelaide Observer, were purchased in May 1853 by a consortium of Andrews, William Kyffin Thomas, Anthony Forster and Joseph Fisher. From that date to the time of his death he took an active part in the management of that journal.

== Public works ==
- In January 1840, Andrews was elected a member of the first Adelaide City Council, serving for two years.
- In April 1840 was appointed a member of the Committee for the Protection of Religious Freedom, whose object was to secure the abolition of the (Anglican) Colonial Chaplaincy, thus putting all denominations on an equal footing free from State control.
- In 1841, with Sir George Kingston and others, Andrews was chosen by the Royal Statistical Society to collect information on the financial condition of the colony.
- In 1864 he was made a Justice of the Peace.
- In 1867 he was elected Mayor of Glenelg. It was as mayor that he was the first person to welcome the Duke of Edinburgh on his arrival in South Australia on 30 October 1867.
- He was an active member of the Royal Agricultural and Horticultural Society, and in 1860 was elected president, and until his death he was one of the vice-presidents. He edited, gratis, the society's short-lived journal Farm and Garden, the basis for Albert Molineux' successful Garden and Field.
- He was also a Governor of the Botanic Gardens.

== Mutual societies ==
Shortly after Andrews' arrival in the colony, he became a member of the Masonic Order. He was initiated in the Lodge of Friendship in the year 1840, and for many years was an active member and for a considerable time Master of the Lodge of Harmony, and on his retiring from the chair in 1853 he was presented with a handsome Past Master's jewel by the members of the Lodge. In 1848 he was appointed Secretary of the Provincial Grand Lodge of the English Constitution, which office he filled until 1854. On resigning he was presented with a valuable gold watch and chain by the members of the Provincial Grand Lodge in recognition of his services. He was also for many years a prominent member of the Society of Oddfellows.

== Family ==
Andrews was one of twelve children. Andrews' brother Frederick George Andrews (ca.1812 – ca.26 March 1892) was an insurance broker in Melbourne who came to Adelaide in 1840 on the Countess of Durham. He married Jane Fullarton Frew on 14 February 1849. She was a sister of James Frew jun. (see below).

His sister Emily Augusta (ca.1827 – 5 July 1862) was a writer and muse to the Pre-Raphaelite Brotherhood. She married Coventry Patmore, author of the poem The Angel in the House inspired by Emily.

Andrews married Emily Annette Bray (? – 30 July 1853). He married again, to Margaret Elizabeth Hunter (? – 25 April 1892) on 8 January 1861.

He had two sons and two daughters by his first wife:

- Eliza Annette (died 1839)
- Hargrave Edward,(1840 – 4 July 1869)
- Helen Johnstone (1843 – 3 August 1911) married Frederic Law (ca.1843 – 20 June 1870) of Penola on 22 December 1869. She remarried, to James Frew jun. (21 October 1840 – 8 September 1877) on 20 July 1876. There is no record of her having married a third time.
- Forester Benjamin (11 Jan 1842 - 23 Aug 1920) married Janet Dickson Brown (1850-1927), children: Forester Edward (1871-1918) Hargrave William (1873-1955), Ernest Hunter (1875-1901), Arthur Alexander (1877-1914), Percival Henry (1879-1950), Margaret Elizabeth (1881-1961), Edward William (1885-1962), and Edith Maude Hayes (1888-1969).

In the hope of recovering his failing health, he journeyed to Port Elliot, but died shortly after from a disease of the liver.

== Obituary ==
John Howard Clark, in the persona of "Geoffry Crabthorn" wrote a moving tribute to his friend and colleague:

It will not I imagine be expected for a moment that my accustomed column of fun and satire should this week make its appearance when the whole of the Register staff are mourning the loss of one who was respected and beloved by all who knew him. Let the writer of these lines lay aside for a time his wonted garb of motley, and record with regretful reverence the breaking of a bond of union which has grown and strengthened with the lapse of years. I have known Edward William Andrews, now so suddenly taken from among us, for more than half my life. I have to look back a long way now to fix the time when pleasant acquaintance ripened into firm and lasting friendship — a friendship which I am glad and proud to think was truly mutual. In all those years of acquaintance and of friendship I have rarely met a man more truly estimable. With a tact and judgment which proved invaluable to those who were privileged to profit by his counsel, with a facile pen which has occasionally — despite an inconquerable diffidence — enriched this column of mine, and indeed not this alone, with graceful verse, with a devotion to duty which spared no toil and even defied the inroads of weakness and physical suffering, he combined a tender heartedness which ever shrank from giving pain, a wide sympathy always on the alert to succour in secret the humble and the needy, to share and alleviate the sorrows of a friend, or to contribute to the happiness of those around him, a thoughtful kindness which shrewdly anticipated the wants of those he wished to help, and above all a devout and reverent spirit which lifted him above the din and turmoil of this restless world towards that purer atmosphere where it is our solace to believe his soul has found its lasting rest. Let me, in closing this brief and all imperfect record of a lamented friend, so far dare to raise the veil of privatelife as to note one striking trait — the surest test I know of a true-hearted man. The little children always sought him gladly, and when they came to know him well there were none of them but loved him dearly. For my part, I would not wish a nobler epitaph than that. Half a century hence, when those who shared his toils and knew his highest worth have long passed away, the memory of Edward William Andrews will still be lovingly recalled by those whose childhood's days were gladdened by his presence, and for whom he ever had a ready smile, a gentle word of kindness, and a thoughtful care.
