= Royal Agricultural and Horticultural Society of South Australia =

Association in South Australia, Australia

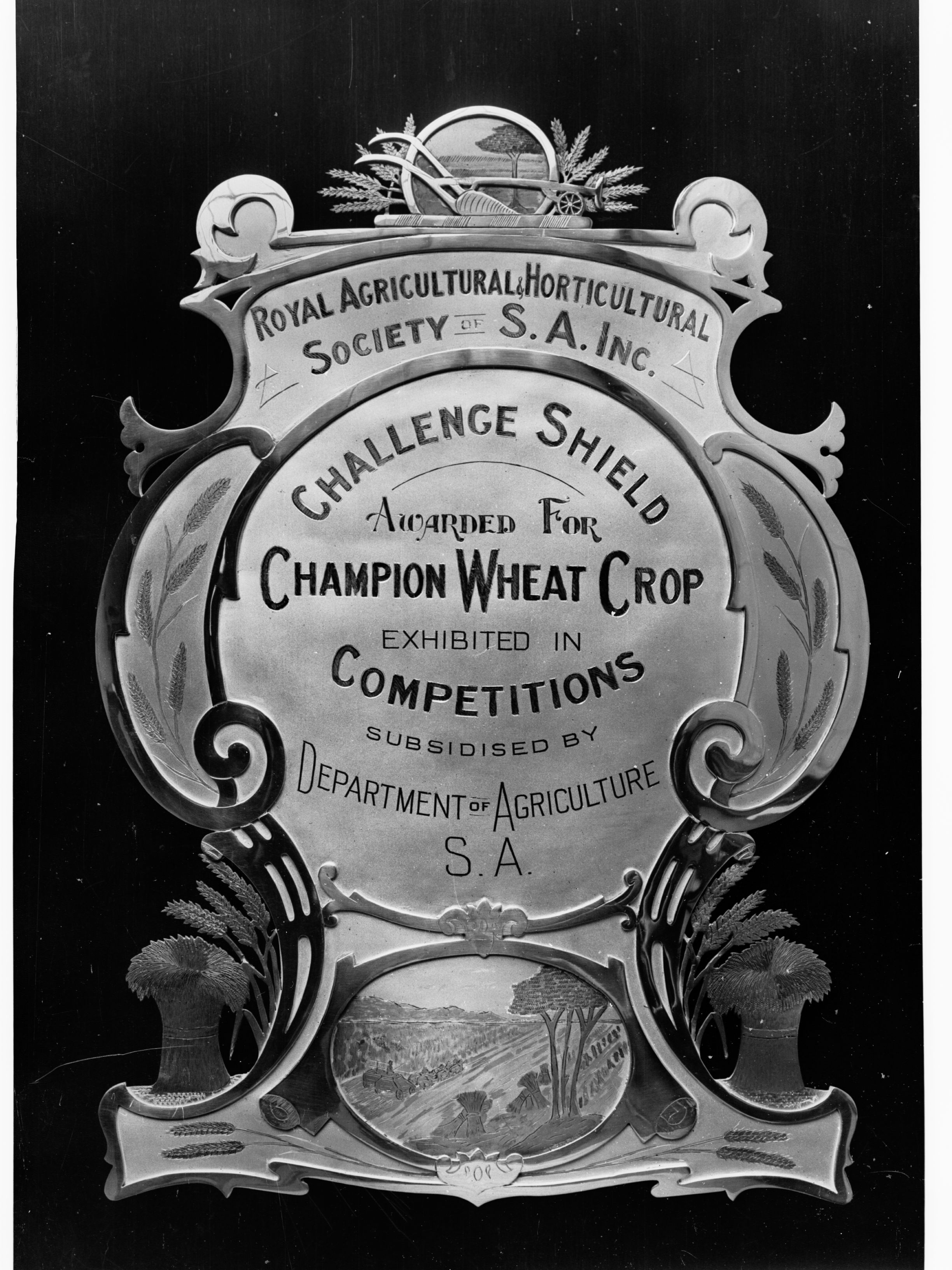
Plaque for Champion Wheat Crop, ca. 1928

The Royal Agricultural and Horticultural Society of South Australia was founded in November 1839 as the South Australian Agricultural Society with the aim of promoting primary industries in the Colony. The Society and its functions were patterned on similar organisations in England, and in its successive incarnations, the organisation has continued to pursue this aim (in the State) to the current day.

== History ==
=== Foundation ===
The South Australian Agricultural Society was founded as the result of a public meeting held on 28 October 1839.

The original Constitution provided for a President, four Vice-Presidents, Hon. Secretary, Hon. Treasurer and a committee of 18 citizens selected by a formula intended to give representation to the range of members' interests and locations, one-third of whom were to retire annually by rotation. At some later stage, the committee increased to 40.

The initial appointees were

President:
David McLaren
Vice-Presidents:
Charles Sturt, John Barton Hack, J. H. Fisher and John Morphett
Hon. Secretary:
Captain Charles Berkeley
Hon. Treasurer:
J. A. Jackson
Committee:
- Robert Cock
- William Giles sen.
- E. B. Gleeson
- Stephen Hack
- John Hallett
- J. Keynes
- John Knott
- R. R. Leake
- D. McFarlane
- T. S. O'Halloran
- William Pinkerton
- W. B. Randell
- Ed Rowlands
- John Rogers
- S. Stephens
- George Stevenson
- T. B. Strangways
- Thomas Williams

Governor Gawler accepted nomination as Patron.

On 23 November a group, discontented with the way membership of the Society had dropped away, resolved to re-inaugurate the Society as though it no longer existed. They advertised for a public meeting to be held on 6 December 1840 at Fordham's Hotel, conducted by a steering committee consisting of:

- David McLaren (Chairman)
- Charles Berkeley (Hon. Sec.)
- James Frew
- John Hallett
- John Morphett
- William Pinkerton
- George Stevenson
- Charles Sturt
- H. Watson
- W. S. Whitington
- T. Williams of Hermitage

=== Agricultural and Horticultural Society ===
On 24 January 1842 a meeting was held at the Mayor (Thomas Wilson)'s chambers to form the South Australian Agricultural and Horticultural Society.

Office holders elected were

Patron:
His Excellency the Governor (George Edward Grey).
Hon. Secretary:
Henry Watson, Esq.
Hon. Treasurer:
J. A. Jackson
Committee:
- Thomas Wilson
- Charles Sturt
- A. H. Davis
- D. McFarlane
- Angus McLaine
- Jacob Hagen
- George Stevenson
- Thomas Williams, of Hermitage.

=== Turmoil ===
In February 1843 there was a popular feeling that the Society had been negligent in preparing for the Autumn Show. J. Bentham Neales offered the use of his auction yard as the venue, perhaps to stimulate some activity. (It was held, on 17 March, but only made possible by donations solicited by John Morphett from wealthy friends, as the Society had no funds.)

In August 1843, James Frew, president of the Ploughing Match Society met with others to change the name of his society to the South Australian Agricultural Society (the original title of the Agricultural and Horticultural Society), and possibly to conduct shows of animals and produce. Under that name, the society conducted ploughing matches on 1 September 1843 The two organisations differed in their memberships: the S.A.A.& H.S. was largely composed of men of wealth and influence while the Ploughing Match Society/S.A.A.S. was more oriented to the practical farmer. Among their members were:

- James Frew (1804–1878) (president)
- John Wotherspoon (1802–1850)(secretary)
- Thomas Kirkpatrick Auld (treasurer)
- Auld (jun.)
- Giles
- Benjamin Greig
- John Harkness
- Hogarth
- Lambert
- McEwen
- Masters
- Pinkerton
- W. Smillie
- E. Stirling
- Stocks
- Thomson
- Thornber

A meeting was called by officials of the S.A.A.& H.S. for Saturday 27 April 1844 to resolve the situation that, even if the two bodies could coexist, the similarity of their titles would be confusing to the public.

The Annual General Meeting of the Agricultural Society at Payne's Hotel on 7 May 1844 commenced with the chairman Mr Frew detailing activities of the previous year – (besides the ploughing match on 1 September, a Cattle Show on 20 October and exhibition of produce on 14 February) and looked forward to an Agricultural Show in September, in competition with that of the R.A.& H.S. Conceding that unification was necessary, he argued that the only way it could occur was by members of the other Society changing sides. The tone of the meeting changed however when Mr Lambert and Mr Harkness spoke in favour of union, with the proviso that Mr. Wotherspoon should by the Secretary of the unified Society.

=== Royal Patronage ===
In April 1868, following the highly successful Grand Exhibition, at which he was guest of honour, the Duke of Edinburgh accepted the role of Patron of the Society, which then became the Royal Agricultural and Horticultural Society of South Australia.

== Office holders ==
=== Presidents ===
- 1839 David McLaren
- 1840 George Gawler
- 1841 George Grey
- 1846 Frederick Holt Robe
- 1849 Henry Edward Fox Young
- 1854 position dropped

=== Chairmen and Presidents ===
The title "Chairman" changed to "President" with the 1859 election.

- 1845 John Morphett
- 1847 Edward Stephens
- 1848 Charles Hervey Bagot
- 1849 William Wyatt
- 1850 Abraham Hopkins Davis
- 1852 John Baker
- 1858 John Hart
- 1859 George Strickland Kingston
- 1860 William Milne
- 1861 Edward William Andrews
- 1862 George McEwin
- 1863 George Charles Hawker
- 1864 John Baker
- 1866 Alexander Borthwick Murray
- 1867 Arthur Blyth
- 1868 John Baker
- 1873 Samuel Davenport
- 1880 Robert Dalrymple Ross
- 1886 John Howard Angas
- 1889 George Charles Hawker
- 1890 Samuel Davenport
- 1891 J. Lancelot Stirling
- 1893 John Robertson
- 1895 William Gilbert
- 1898 Alfred Muller Simpson
- 1900 Samuel Goode
- 1902 John Murray
- 1904 Thomas Hardy
- 1905 (Henry) John Hill
- 1907 Alick J. Murray
- 1909 James Rowell
- 1911 W. B. Rounsevell
- 1913 R. H. Crawford
- 1919 Robert T Wallace
- 1921 J. Wallace Sandford
- 1924 Walter Gordon Duncan
- 1926 J. Lancelot Stirling
- 1932 Sir Walter Gordon Duncan
- 1951 J Keith Angas
- 1959 Robert C. Gosse
- 1964 Rex C. Warnes
- 1976 John J. Duncan

=== Secretaries ===
From 1955 the position was described as Director/Secretary

- 1839 Charles Berkeley
- 1842 Henry Watson ( – ca.15 July 1894)
- 1843 William James, Thomas Auld
- 1844 John Wotherspoon (ca.1802 – 12 November 1850)
- 1844 G. S. Kingston
- 1846 Lewis Bryant
- 1847 E(dward) Amand Wright (ca.1822 – 13 June 1891)
- 1850 Charles J(ohn) Barry (1825 – 18 November 1896)
- 1853 J(ohn) Thain Just (ca.1816 – 24 April 1854)
- 1854 Nicholas James, jun. ( – 22 October 1861)
- 1855 George Alston (1830 – 27 May 1908)
- 1856 F. S. C. Driffield
- 1866 Ebenezer Ward
- 1869 C(harles) J(ames) Coates (6 January 1820 – 9 October 1889)
- 1890 C(hristopher) M(ichael) Bagot jun.
- 1900 John Creswell
- 1910 Joseph A. "Joe" Riley
- 1926 Harold J. Finnis MBE (a grandson of Captain John Finnis, droving companion of Charles Sturt)
- 1960 Ronald H. Sedsman MBE
- 1983 Gary T. Campbell

== Activities ==
The Society's most visible activities were the Shows and Exhibitions, but also contributed in other ways:

- During Show Week, farmers descend on Adelaide from all over the state. Lectures and papers during show week inform of developments and educate in farm management.
- coordinated farmers' experiences with problems such as Red rust in wheat
- promulgated information on oil seeds, foot, and mouth disease outbreak in UK 1881, phylloxera, codlin moth, rabbits
- supported the work of Professor Lowrie in the face of criticism from politicians in SA and elsewhere.
- conducted tests of farm machinery and methods, often in the form of public contests.
- Egg Laying Contests
- Prizes and medals awarded to students at Roseworthy College

=== Ploughing matches ===
This event, as popularized in England, had teams of horses or bullocks competing and were judged on the straightness and uniformity of depth of the furrow and the way the earth was turned over, and of course the time for the team to complete its allocated area. Prizes were allocated according to divisions which reflected the class of ploughing team. Difficulties in organising such events included finding sufficient area of uniform consistency to give ensure fair competition and having had sufficient rain that the ground was not impossibly hard and yet not boggy. The first such organised in South Australia was by the South Australian Agricultural Society in September 1843 and attracted considerable public interest and was emulated by many of the regional agricultural societies.

== Country societies ==
During the 19th and early 20th centuries, many South Australian country centres formed societies with similar aims, following the British model. These included:

- Auburn
- Balaklava and Dalkey
- Blyth and Kybunga
- Booyoolie
- Burra
- Carrieton
- Central Eyre Peninsula
- Central Yorke Peninsula
- Clare
- Clarendon
- Colton (15 km north of Elliston)
- Cummins
- Dry Creek
- Eudunda
- Gawler
- Golden Grove
- Great Flinders Agricultural and Horticultural Society first show 1903 at Lipson.
- Gumeracha
- Hindmarsh
- Kalangadoo
- Kapunda
- Karoonda
- Kingston (i.e. Kingston SE)
- Lake Albert
- Lipson
- Longwood
- Loxton
- Lucindale
- Lyndoch Valley
- Maitland
- Mallala and Dublin
- Mannum
- Millicent
- Mintaro
- Moonta
- Mount Compass and Nangkita
- Mount Gambier
- Mount Lofty
- Mount Pleasant
- Mount Remarkable
- Murray Bridge
- Northern Areas Amalgamated Agricultural and Horticultural Societies Cradock in 1883, Wilson in 1884)
- Onkaparinga
- Orroroo
- Penola
- Penong and Western Districts
- Petersburg
- Pinnaroo
- Port Elliot (Southern Agricultural and Horticultural Society)
- Port Lincoln
- Port Pirie
- Port Wakefield
- Quorn
- Renmark
- Robe
- Saddleworth
- Snowtown
- Southern
- Southern Yorke Peninsula
- Stanley
- Stirling
- Strathalbyn
- Tantanoola
- Tatiara
- Torrens Valley
- Two Wells/Two Wells Amalgamated
- Uraidla and Summertown
- Virginia and Port Gawler
- Willowie
- Willunga, Aldinga, McLaren Vale, Noarlunga
- Wilmington (Beautiful Valley Agricultural and Horticultural Society in 1883)
- Wooroora
- Yankalilla
- Yatina
- Yorketown

== See also ==
- Gardening in Australia
- Royal Adelaide Show
- Adelaide Showgrounds
- RAHS timeline

== Sources ==
- Kerr, Colin and Margaret Royal Show Stock Journal Publishers, for Royal Agricultural and Horticultural Society 1983 ISBN 0 9596833 1 3
