= Abraham Hopkins Davis =

Australian horticulturist and businessman

Anthony Hopkins Davis (c. August 1796 – 4 June 1866) was a businessman and horticulturist in the early days of the Colony of South Australia.

== History ==
He was elected an alderman on the first Adelaide City Council, which was disbanded in 1843 as unaffordable.

In 1849, he supported representative government, and denounced attempts to establish a peerage, whether life or hereditary. He stood for West Torrens at the first elections for the unicameral South Australian Legislative Council in 1851, but was defeated by Charles Simeon Hare, by a majority of two. He never again stood for public office, but was for some years Chairman of the District Council of West Torrens. His political views then changed remarkably – in 1853 he supported, in letters under the signature of "Vigil", the conservative view of an upper house appointed for life. He expounded these views in the journal Thursday Review he edited in 1859. He frequently aired his views in "Letters to the Editor". His obituary noted that "... though in his writings he displayed some want of respect for the opinions of others, and although many complained of a bitterness of manner in dealing with political questions and political men, all acknowledged his sincerity, and respected his never-failing moral courage ... and who, in his various public positions, displayed the qualities of an able man and a good citizen."

== Family ==
Abraham Hopkins Davis (c. August 1796 – 4 June 1866) was married to Mary Davis (c. 1793 – 3 April 1846). Their children who emigrated were:

- Mary Ann Davis (ca. 1819 – 29 November 1857) married Henry Stanford ( – 1872? 1881?) of Meadows on 31 October 1844
- Emily Davis (c. 1820 – 26 March 1856) married Thomas Stanford ( – 1887?) on 19 January 1848
- Frederick Charles Davis (c. 1827 – 23 March 1881) married Nancy Nicholls ( – 1874) on 10 December 1851, settled at Crystal Brook
- Alfred Davis ( – c. 8 May 1873) married Ellen Frances Palmer (c. 1834 – 17 March 1862) on 12 June 1856

He married a second time, to Harriet Williams (c. 1803 – 17 September 1866) on 8 May 1848. Her mother died at Moore Farm on 21 May 1849.
