= South Australian Employers' Chamber of Commerce and Industry =

South Australian Business Chamber
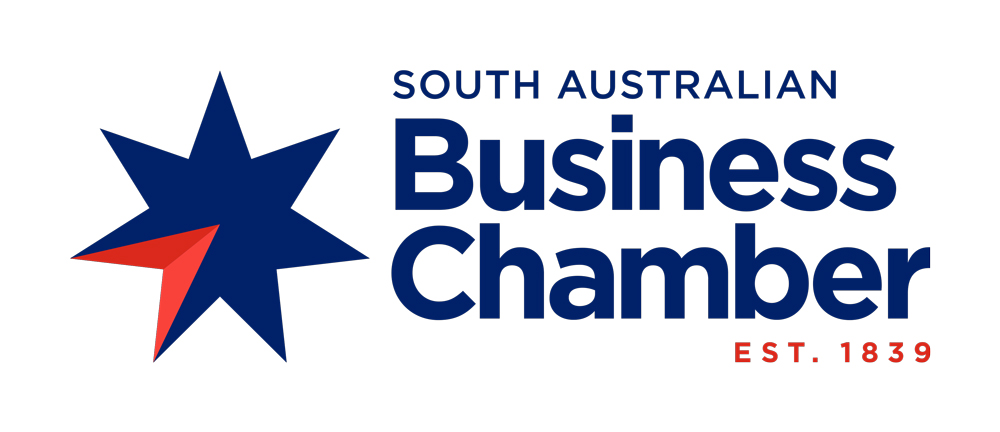
- Nickname: The Chamber
- Predecessor: Adelaide Chamber of Commerce; South Australian Chamber of Manufactures
- Formation: 1839; 187 years ago
- Merger of: South Australian Employers' Federation; Chamber of Commerce and Industry SA
- Type: Chamber of commerce
- Headquarters: Adelaide
- Location: Level 1 136 Greenhill Road, Unley
- Chair: Nikki Govan
- Website: www.business-sa.com

The South Australian Employers' Chamber of Commerce and Industry (known as South Australian Business Chamber since 2024) is an independent and non-profit association representing businesses and employers in South Australia. It is a member of the Australian Chamber of Commerce and Industry. Business SA is South Australia’s largest membership-based employer organisation with over 4,000 members across 19 different industry sectors.

The purpose of the South Australian Business Chamber is to support the business community and help businesses to grow. Business SA offers the following products and services to its members including HR and workplace relations, WHS in the workplace, training courses, business growth and succession, entrepreneur programs, international services, business advice hotline, networking and advocacy.

== History ==
Historically, employer organisations in Australia were established to counter the union movement’s growing industrial relations influence. This became more important over time as union tactics became increasingly aggressive, making it harder for individual employers to deal with their employees in good faith.

Business SA can trace its origins back to 1839. Just three years after the Colony of South Australia was established, the Adelaide Chamber of Commerce was formed on 7 January 1839.

This was followed by the South Australian Chamber of Manufacturers in 1869 as a lobby and support group for manufacturers, and the South Australian Employers’ Federation in 1889.

In 1972, the Adelaide Chamber of Commerce and the South Australian Chamber of Manufacturers merged to form the Chamber of Commerce and Industry SA, Inc.

In 1993, the Chamber of Commerce and Industry and the South Australian Employers’ Federation merged to form the South Australian Employers’ Chamber of Commerce and Industry Inc.

The name Business SA was officially launched in 2000.

The South Australian Business Chamber was launched in 2024.
