= Bickford (surname) =

Bickford is a surname. Notable people with the surname include:

- Andrew Bickford (1844–1927), Admiral, Royal Navy; Commander-in-Chief, Pacific Station
- Bruce Bickford (animator) (1947–2019), American animated-films maker
- Bruce Bickford (athlete) (born 1957), American long-distance runner
- Charles Bickford (1891–1967), American actor
- Drucilla Roberts Bickford (1925–2024), American politician
- George Bickford (1927–2009), Australian rules footballer
- James Bickford (bobsleigh) (1912–1989), American olympic bobsledder
- John F. Bickford (1843–1927), received the Medal of Honor for actions during the American Civil War
- Kerri Bickford, American politician
- Matthew Bickford (1839–1918), received the Medal of Honor for actions during the American Civil War
- Phil Bickford (born 1995), American baseball player
- Vern Bickford (1920–1960), American baseball pitcher
- William Bickford (1774–1834), inventor of the safety fuse
- William Bickford (1815–1850), first pharmacist and pharmaceutical chemist in the colony of South Australia
- William Bickford (1841–1916), turned A.M. Bickford & Sons into a major drug company and successful soft-drink manufacturer
