= Bickford (disambiguation) =

Bickford is a village in England.

Bickford may also refer to:

== People ==
- Bickford (surname)
- William Bickford Row (1786-1865), Newfoundland merchant, lawyer and politician
- Zahr Myron Bickford (1876-1961), Mandolin virtuoso, author of Bickford Mandolin Method and Bickford Banjo Method

== Other uses ==
- Bickford, Ontario, a community of the township of St. Clair
- Bickford, Oklahoma, a ghost town in Oklahoma
- Ensign-Bickford Company in Simsbury, Connecticut
- The Amazing Mr. Bickford, a Frank Zappa video featuring Claymation
- The Education of Max Bickford, a television series
- Bickford Shmeckler's Cool Ideas, a 2006 film

== See also ==
- Bickford's (disambiguation)
