= John Lewis (Australian politician) =

Australian pastoralist and politician

John Lewis CMG
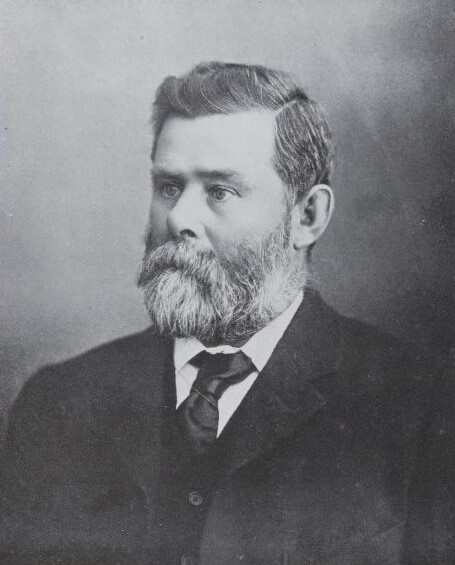

Personal details
- Born: 12 February 1844
- Died: 25 August 1923 (aged 79)
- Spouse(s): Martha Anne Brook and Florence Margaret Toll (nee Mortlock)
- Relations: Sandy Lewis and Tom Lewis (grandsons) William Ranson Mortlock (second father-in-law)
- Children: 6, including Essington Lewis (1881–1961)
- Parent(s): James Lewis (1813–1891) and Eliza Margaret Hutton Lewis (1825–1906) (nee Bristow)

John Lewis (12 February 1844 – 25 August 1923) was an Australian pastoralist and politician. He was a member of the South Australian Legislative Council from 1898 to 1923, representing the Northern District (1898-1902) and North-Eastern District (1902-1923). He was the father of Essington Lewis.

== Biography ==
John Lewis was born on 12 February 1844 in Brighton, South Australia, the son of James Lewis, who had been a member of the original party, under William Light, which surveyed the City of Adelaide, and had accompanied Charles Sturt on his 1844 expedition down the Murray.

He left school at the age of twelve to work on his father's farm in Richmond, leaving him two years later to work as a sheep drover and in other occupations. From 1867 to 1885, he was employed as Liston, Shakes and Co.'s agent in Burra. In 1871, he made a trip to the Northern Territory with his brother James to secure a property on behalf of George McLachlan. He set down details of this trip in his autobiography Fought and Won.

He returned to Adelaide in 1876, when he married and settled in Burra. He joined William Liston (ca.1840–1901) and James Shakes in their stock and station agency, and acted as their agent in Burra from 1876 to 1885 when Liston resigned and the company operated as Lewis & Shakes until 1888 when they joined with George W. Bagot as Bagot, Shakes & Lewis. The company absorbed Luxmoore, Dowling & Jeffrey in May 1906. About the same time Lewis left Burra for Adelaide, moving into the imposing residence 'Benacre' in Glen Osmond, built for William Bickford. He acquired various pastoral properties in South Australia: Dalhousie Springs, Witchelina, Mount Nor'-West, Ediacara, Nappa Merrie, Coronga Peak, and Newcastle Waters, many in conjunction with Sir Thomas Elder. When his joint managing George Wallwall Bagot died on 8 July 1919, Lewis stood down, leaving his son Lancelot Ashley Lewis and George Jeffrey to be appointed by the committee as their replacements.

Bagot, Shakes & Lewis was absorbed by Goldsbrough Mort & Co. in 1924.

== Politics ==
In 1897 he stood as candidate for the North-Eastern district in the Legislative Council and was successful; in 1902 he was a successful candidate for the Northern seat, and held it until 1923.

== Other interests ==
Lewis was a member of the Royal Geographical Society of South Australia and for seven years its president.

He was vice-president of the Royal Society of St. George, an active member of the Pastoralists' Association, the Aborigines' Friends' Association, the Horticultural and Floricultural Society, the South Australian Soldiers Fund, and the Adelaide Children's Hospital.

In 1922 Alfred Thomas Saunders (1854-1940), an accountant and historian, wrote an article published in The Register (Adelaide, 23 January) drawing attention to a pamphlet, "Twelve Years' Life in Australia. From 1859 to 1871", which he had found in the Public Library: "There is no date on the pamphlet, nor is the author's name given, and I have failed to trace her. The adventures she had quite rival those of Mr. Lewis, and show that though she was a small woman, she was courageous". He recognised it as a valuable account of experiences in the outback in that time and appealed to the public to help him identify the author, her husband, and the name of their property, noting clues from the text about its author, including that it was written by a woman who arrived on 28 January 1859 as an emigrant on the ship North from Liverpool. A week later the Lewis replied that he thought that the author of the pamphlet was the late Mrs Alexander Wallace, who had gone with her husband to NSW at the time mentioned by Saunders and settled at Sturt's Meadows. He had, in fact, met Abraham and Matilda Wallace in 1867 at Mingary when he was based at Burra. Later Saunders corrected the name of Matilda's husband, Abraham, and indicated that his research had discovered that the author was Matilda Hill. Lewis also paid a tribute to the "wonderful pluck of the woman... It is a big thing to say, but it is questionable whether the annals of the Australian bush reveal a more courageous character among the women pioneers, than was Mrs Abraham Wallace. Her self-told story is indeed an inspiration".

== Family ==
Lewis married Martha Anne Brook (c. 1847 – 3 July 1894) on 18 September 1876. He married again on 5 July 1907 to widow Florence Margaret Toll ( – 23 February 1941), the youngest daughter of William Ranson Mortlock.

== Recognition ==
Lewis was awarded the Order of St Michael and St George (CMG) in January 1923.

== Death and legacy ==
Lewis died on 25 August 1923 in the Adelaide suburb of Glen Osmond.

The John Lewis Medal ("for Exploration" / "for Geographical Research" / for "Literary Work in Geography") was established in 1947 by the Royal Geographical Society of South Australia and continues to be awarded as of 2025. Gold Medallists receive a medal, a certificate, and a citation. It is also known as the Lewis Gold Medal. The John Lewis Silver Medal is awarded to a higher-degree student at a South Australian university "who has made a significant theoretical or empirical contribution to geography".

== Bibliography ==
- Lewis, John (1844–1923) Fought and Won first published in Adelaide by W.K. Thomas & Co., 1922.

(facsimile edition) Adelaide; Printed by Gillingham Printers, 1985. ISBN 0959008713
