= William Bickford =

William Bickford may refer to:

- William Bickford (1774–1834), inventor of the safety fuse
- William Bickford (1815–1850), first pharmacist and pharmaceutical chemist in the colony of South Australia
- William Bickford (1841–1916), turned A.M. Bickford & Sons into a major drug company and successful soft-drink manufacturer
