= Benacre, Glen Osmond =

Historic house in Adelaide, South Australia

Benacre
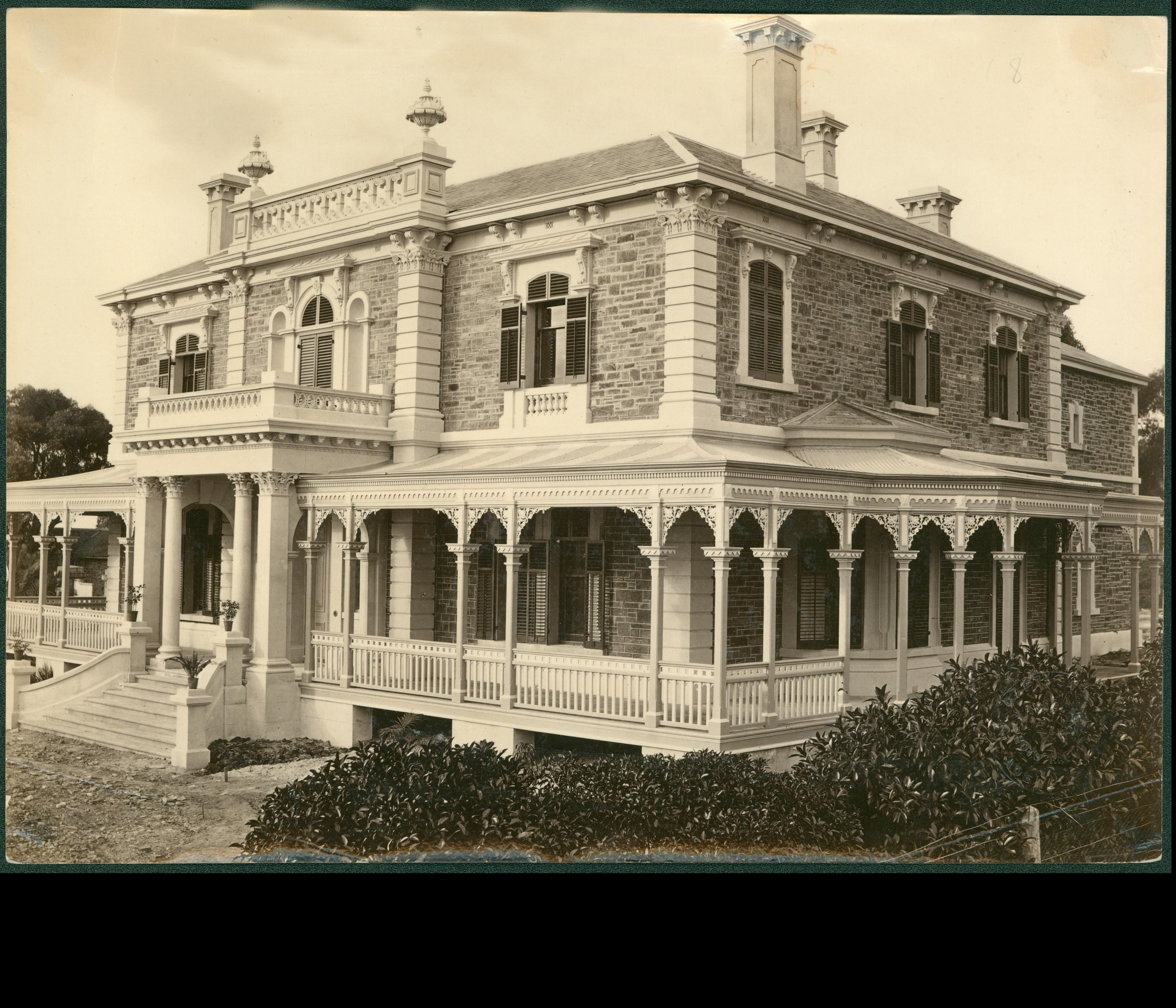
- A photograph of the house circa 1877

- Location within South Australia
- 34°57′34″S 138°38′24″E
- Location: Lot 6, Benacre Close, Glen Osmond, South Australia

South Australian Heritage Register
- Designated: 5 April 1984
- Reference no.: 8375

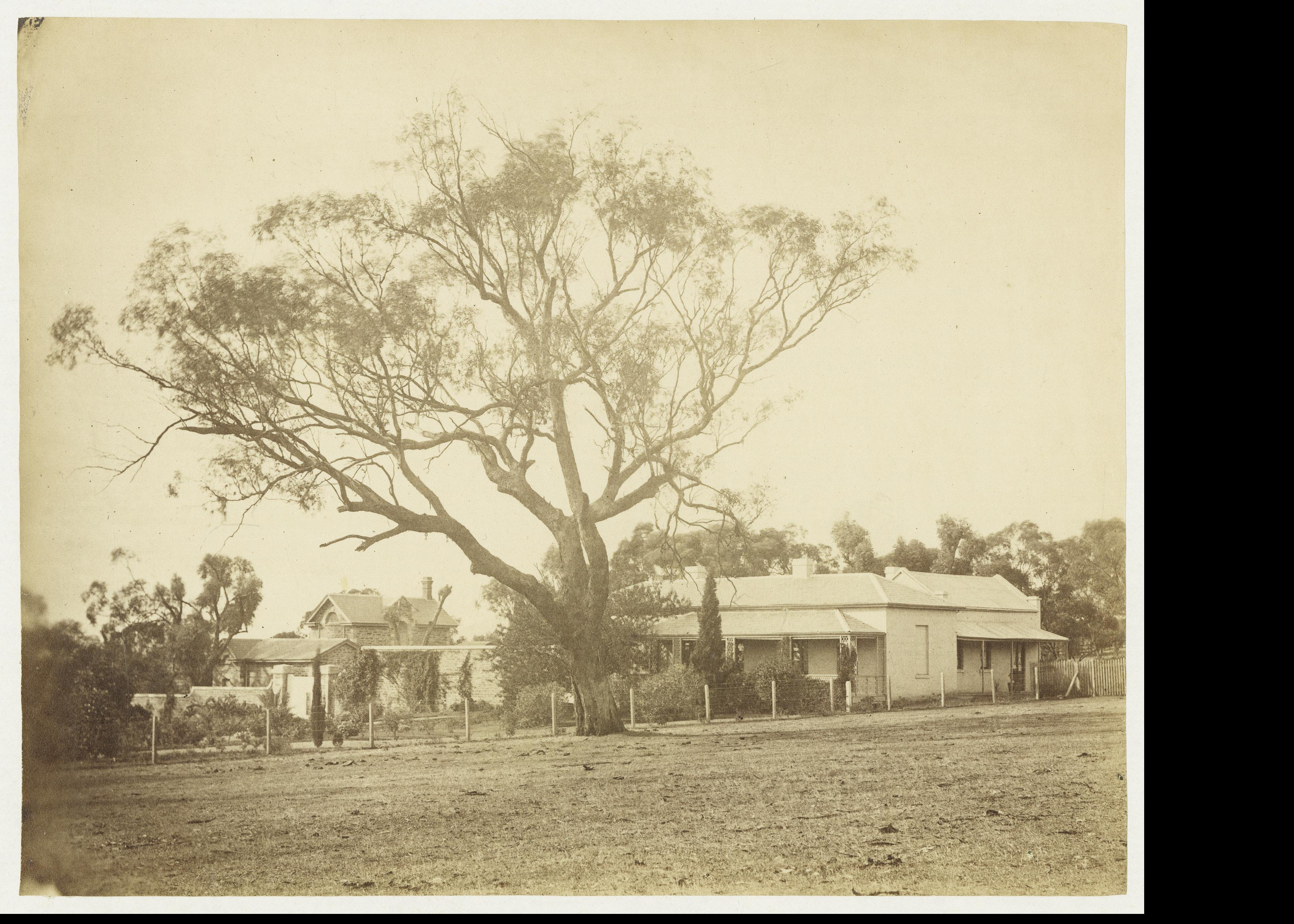
ca. 1850

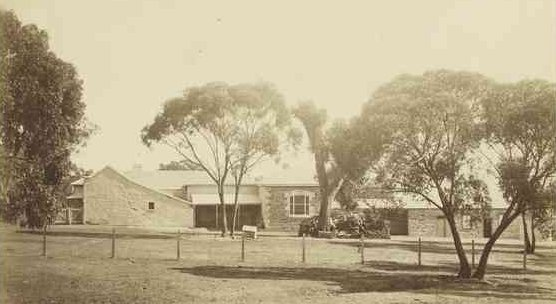
ca. 1850

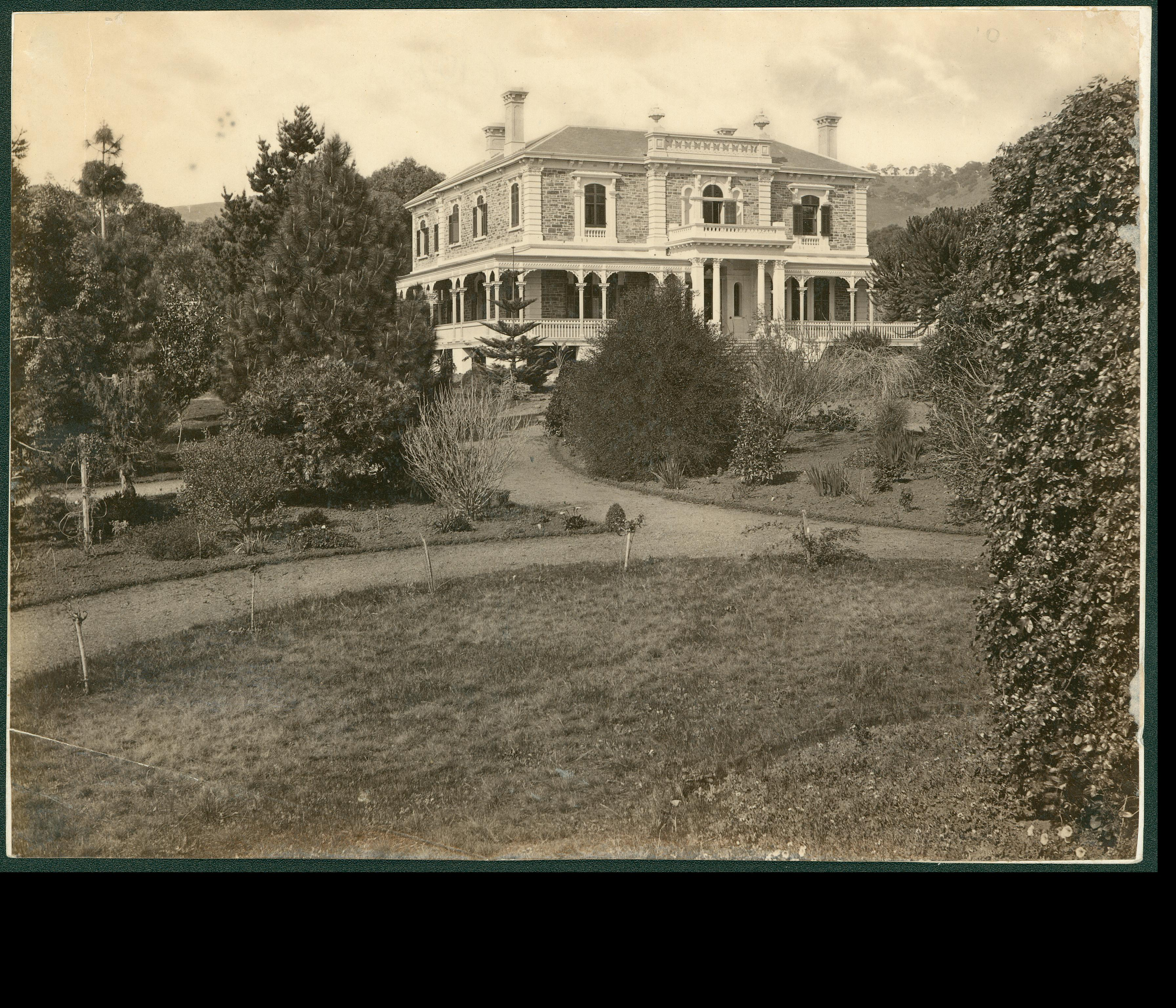
1877

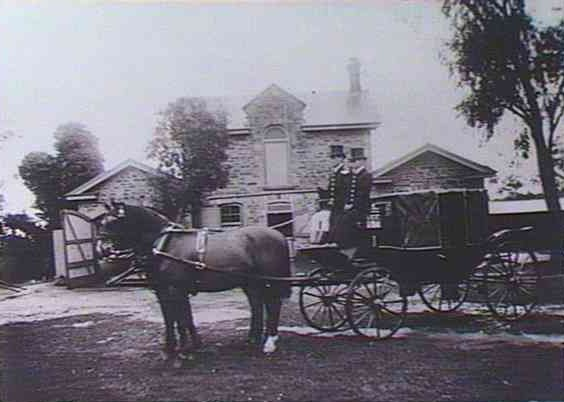
Benacre coach house 1899. Now "The Mews".

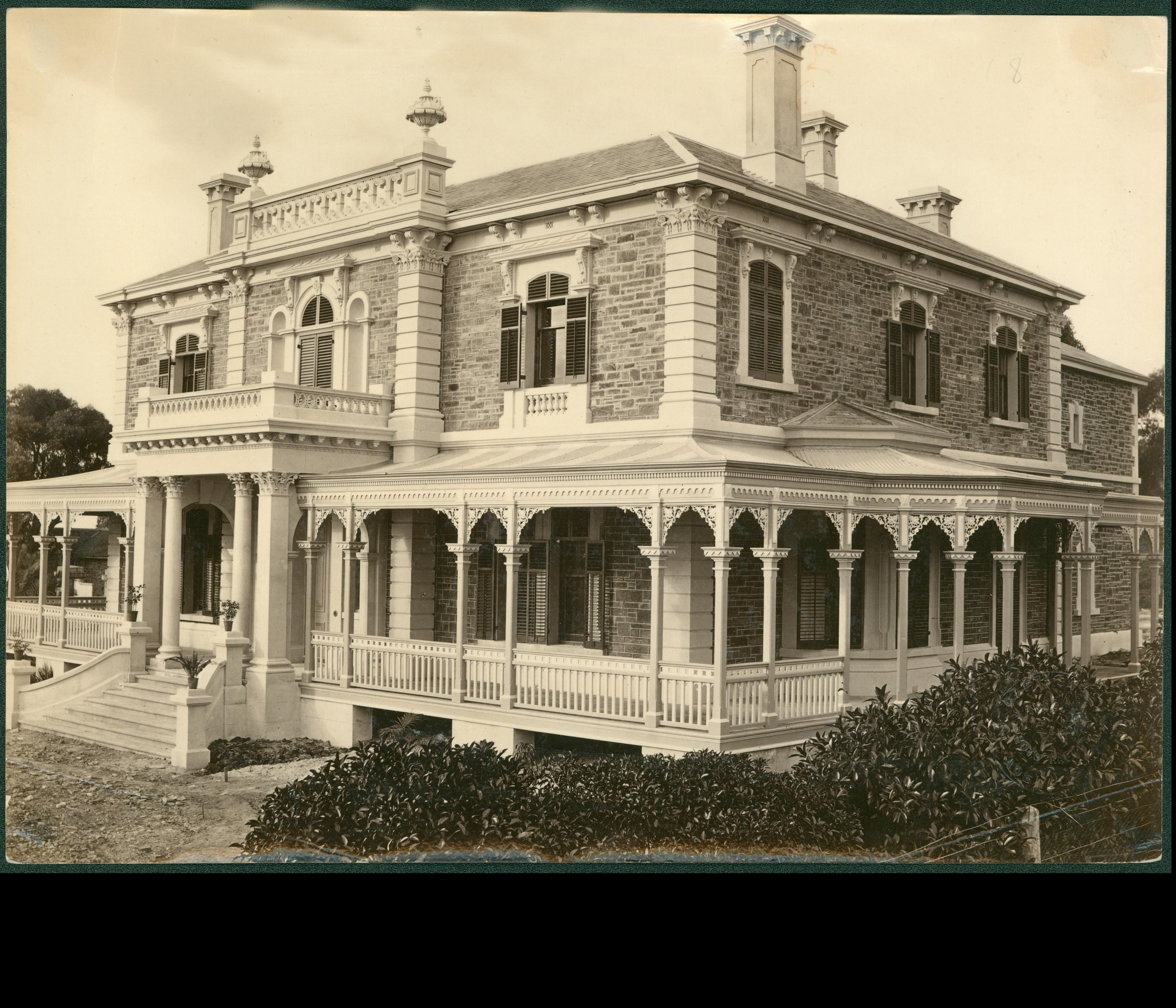
1877

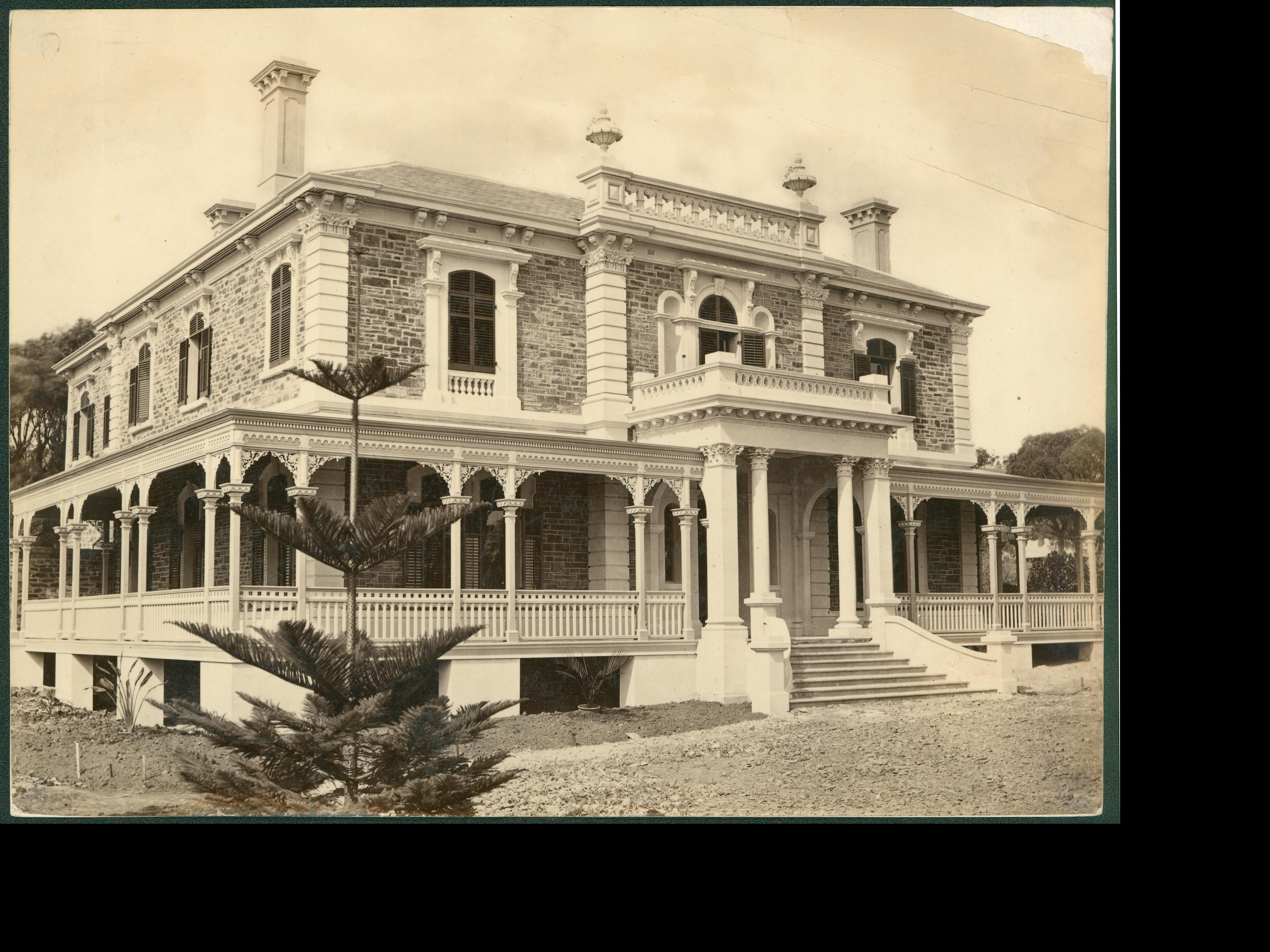
1877

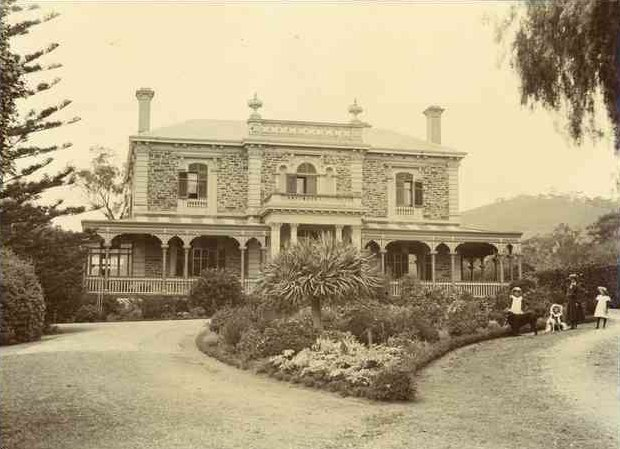
1904

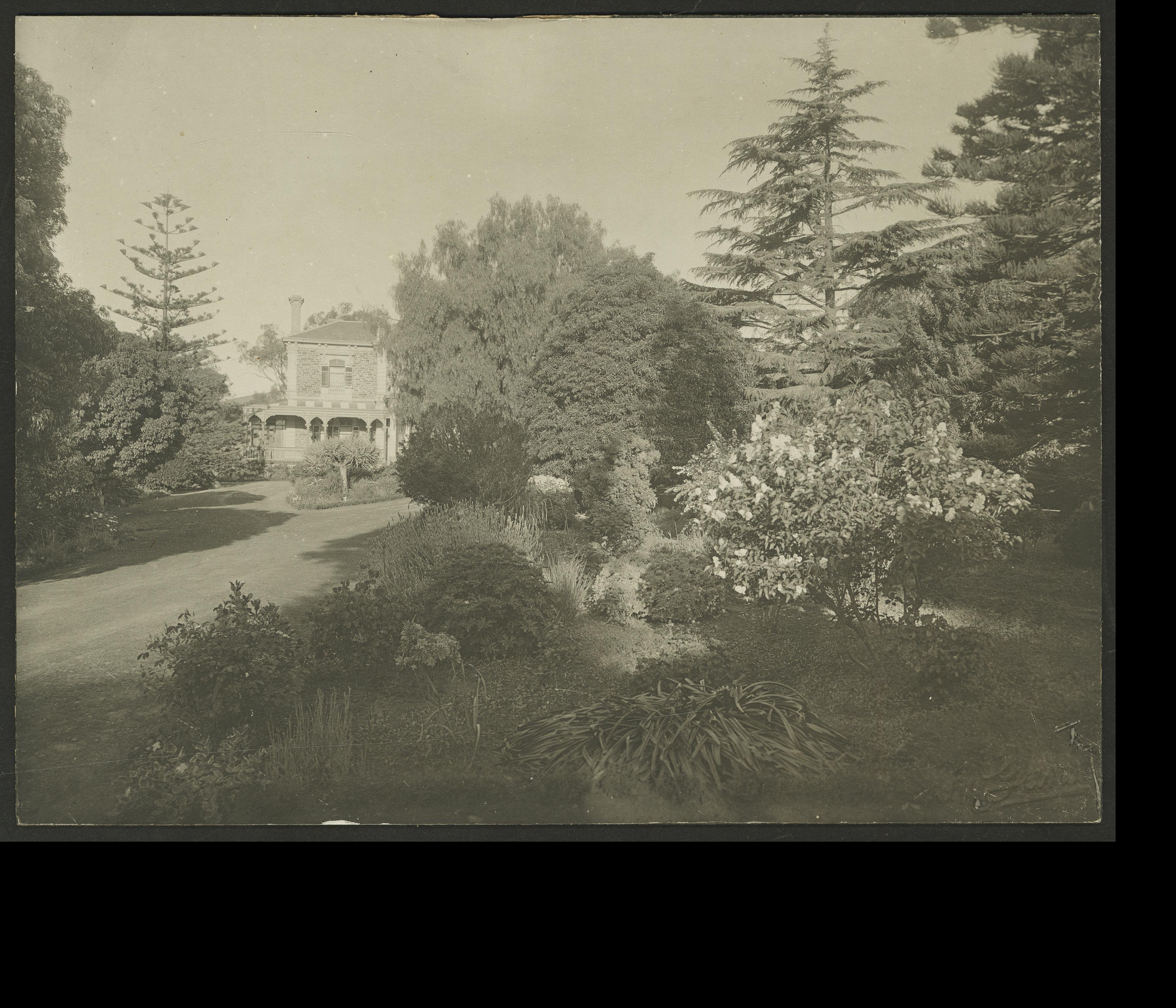
1904

Benacre is a house in Glen Osmond, (an inner south-eastern suburb of Adelaide, South Australia), which was listed on the now-defunct Register of the National Estate. It is located at 6 Benacre Place.

== Background ==
The colony of South Australia was proclaimed on 28 December 1836 at Holdfast Bay, but with no reliable fresh water supply, the initial settlement was by the River Torrens at Adelaide or more specifically, Adelaide city centre and North Adelaide. The settlement was made and administered by the South Australia Company, who also released land in the city and on the Adelaide Plains.

== 1836 ==
The initial allocation of section 270 was to G.F. Shipster, who built a single-storeyed house on the section in 1844. With the subdivision of the section (i.e. bisection) by Glen Osmond Road, it passed to Robert Cock; Shipster purchased section 300 in 1844 from J. Grainger, but died on 30 December 1844 at 'Kensington House' in what is now known as Kensington Park.

== 1846 ==
After the loss of a baby in the summer conditions of the city in December 1845, William Bickford, desiring to escape the unhealthy conditions of his city residence, purchased 16 acres in early 1846, and added to the buildings on the property, including building the stables and coach house which are now registered on the Australian Register of the National Estate. William planted the first garden (one acre in size), and an orchard of 2½ acres. Despite the "healthier country air" however, another son died when less than a month old and the family returned to the city, but William retained the property and was still developing it when he died in 1850.

The next owner was T.B. Strangways, though it is not clear when, or for how long.

He was followed by Thomas Graves. Thomas Graves established a fine garden containing Moreton Bay figs, pines, cedars and cypresses from such diverse places as Norway, India, Lebanon, Japan and Norfolk Island - "an assortment of trees second only to the Adelaide Botanic Garden", according to the book "History of Glen Osmond", (1905). In the mid-1870s, Graves added rooms, a cellar and a top storey.

- http://www.architectsdatabase.unisa.edu.au/arch_full.asp?Arch_ID=55
  - Thomas English was a leading colonial architect in South Australia.
  - English has numerous works listed on the South Australian State Heritage Register (SHR) as both builder and architect.
  - Leading citizens of the day also engaged him; ... Benacre at Glen Osmond (1863) (Page 1986; SHR).

== 1876 ==
In 1861, Henry Scott (Mayor of Adelaide) married Emily Gooch but the couple remained childless. In the mid-1870s they purchased the property and named it "Benacre" after Emily's ancestral home, Benacre Hall, in Benacre, Suffolk. They lived at Benacre in Glen Osmond and Boode House Mount Lofty, and were generous and entertaining hosts; during the Scott’s tenure of some 30 years, they hosted countless social events.

== 1906 ==
In 1906, John Lewis, pastoralist and politician, moved to Adelaide "where he bought an imposing home, Benacre, at Glen Osmond". On 5 July 1907 he married a widow, Florence Margaret Toll, née Mortlock. In 1898-1923 he represented the Northeast (later Northern) District in the Legislative Council. In 1922 Lewis published his autobiography, "Fought and Won". In 1923 he was appointed C.M.G.

During his ownership, a deer park was established.

Lewis died at Benacre on 25 August 1923. His wife and two daughters and four sons, including Essington Lewis, survived him. In 1924, his executors subdivided a portion of the property (part sections 270 and 271, Hundred of Adelaide) into 39 building blocks. (The next street up Glen Osmond Rd from Benacre Close is Lewis Ave.)

== 1924 ==
Benacre was the home of Lancelot Ashley Lewis and Grace Margaret (Gretta) Lewis (nee Laidlaw) in the period 1924-1968 after the couple moved from Adelaide's fashionable East Terrace.

== 1970 ==
- 1970 Further subdivided: "Fifteen magnificent residential allotments, the gracious mansion 'Benacre', two storeyed stone mews, to be sold by auction on the estate 2nd May, 1970 at 10.30 a.m. Adelaide : Matters & Co. Pty. Ltd. [and] Theodore Bruce & Co. Pty. Ltd."

== 1981 ==
- 1981 Historic Benacre auctioned.
