= Sill =

Sill may refer to:

- Sill (geology), a subhorizontal sheet intrusion of molten or solidified magma
- Sill (geostatistics)
- Sill plate, a construction element
  - Window sill, a more specific construction element than above
  - Automotive sill, also known as a rocker panel; see Glossary of automotive design#R
- Sill (river), a river in Austria
- Aquatic sill, a shoal near the mouth of a fjord, remnant of an extinct glacier's terminal moraine
- Bed sill, a low underwater dam (weir)
  - Sill (dock), a weir at the low water mark retaining water within a dock
- Stub sill or draft sill, a sill on DOT-111 tank cars
- Fort Sill, a United States Army post near Lawton, Oklahoma
- Mount Sill, a California mountain

== People ==
=== Sill ===
- Anna Peck Sill (1816–1889), American educator
- Edward Rowland Sill (1841–1887), American poet and educator
- George G. Sill (1829–1907), American politician from Connecticut
- Joel Sill (1946–2025), American music supervisor, music producer, and consultant
- John M. B. Sill (1831–1901), American diplomat
- Joshua W. Sill (1831–1862), American Civil War brigadier general
- Judee Sill (1944–1979), American singer and songwriter
- Lester Sill (1918–1994), American record label executive
- Louise Morgan Sill (1867–1961), American poet
- Thomas Hale Sill (1783–1856), American politician from Pennsylvania
- Zach Sill (born 1988), Canadian ice hockey player

=== Sills ===
- Beverly Sills (1929–2007), American operatic soprano
- David Sills (American football) (born 1996), American football player
- David Sills (judge) (1938–2011), American jurist
- Douglas Sills (born 1960), American actor
- Eileen Sills (born 1962), British chief nurse and NHS national guardian
- Josh Sills (born 1998), American football player
- Kenneth C.M. Sills (1879–1954), American educator
- Milton Sills (1882–1930), American stage and film actor
- Paul Sills (1927–2008), American director and improvisation teacher
- Saskia Sills (born 1996), British windsurfer and sailor
- Steven Sills (fl. 1991–present), American screenwriter and film producer
- Tim Sills (born 1979), English footballer

== See also ==
- Cill (disambiguation)
- Still (disambiguation)
