= Bickford's =

Bickford's may refer to:

- Bickford's Australia, a soft drink company originating in Adelaide, South Australia
  - History of Bickford's Australia, originating as A. M. Bickford & Sons, an Adelaide pharmaceutical manufacturer
- Bickford's (restaurant), a chain of restaurants originating in New York, United States of America
