= Howell G. Trogden =

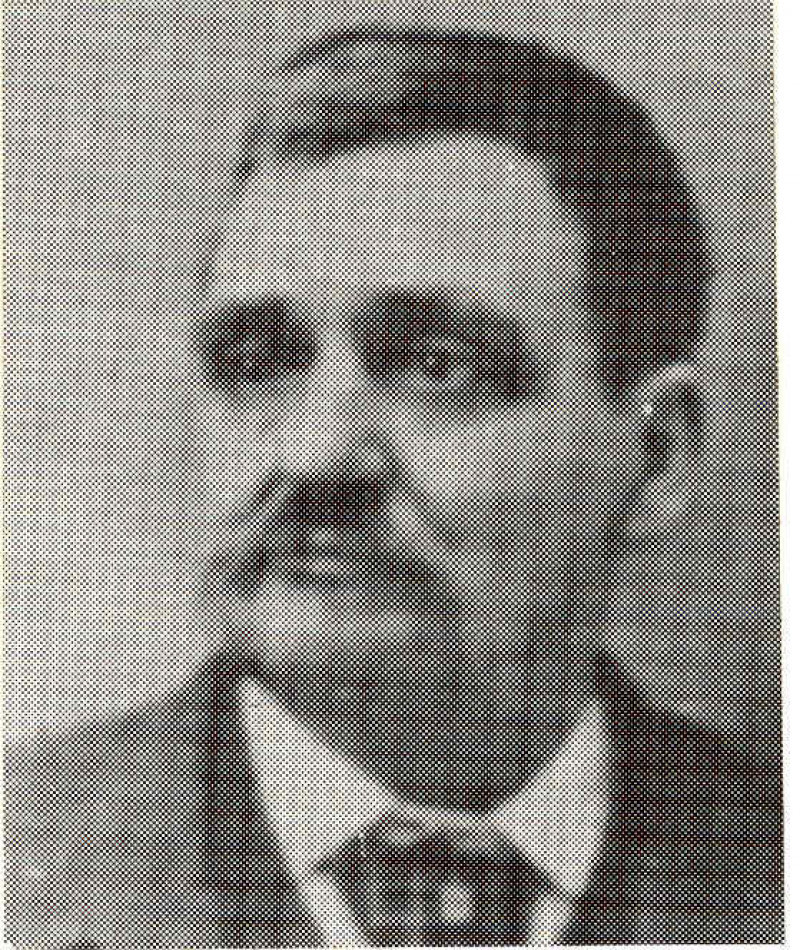
- Born: October 24, 1841; Cedar Falls, North Carolina
- Died: December 2, 1910 (aged 69); California
- Burial place: Los Angeles, California
- Military career
- Allegiance: United States of America
- Branch: United States Army
- Rank: Private
- Unit: 8th Missouri Infantry Regiment
- Conflicts: Battle of Vicksburg; American Civil War
- Awards: Medal of Honor

Howell Gilliam Trogden (October 24, 1841 – December 2, 1910) was an American soldier who fought in the American Civil War. Trogden received his country's highest award for bravery during combat, the Medal of Honor. Trogden's medal was won for his gallantry at the Battle of Vicksburg in Mississippi on May 22, 1863. He was honored with the award on August 3, 1894.

Trogden was born in Cedar Falls, North Carolina, and entered service in St. Louis, Missouri, and was buried in Los Angeles, California.

== Medal of Honor citation ==
The President of the United States of America, in the name of Congress, takes pleasure in presenting the Medal of Honor to Private Howell G. Trogden, United States Army, for gallantry in the charge of the volunteer storming party on 22 May 1863, while serving with Company B, 8th Missouri Infantry, in action at Vicksburg, Mississippi. Private Trogden carried his regiment's flag and tried to borrow a gun to defend it.

== See also ==
- List of American Civil War Medal of Honor recipients: T–Z
