= 8th Missouri Infantry Regiment (Union) =

American Civil War Union Army unit

8th Missouri Infantry Regiment ("American Zouaves")
- Active: June 1861 to June 1865
- Country: United States
- Allegiance: Union
- Branch: Infantry
- Engagements: Battle of Fort Donelson; Battle of Shiloh; Siege of Corinth; Fort Hindman; Yazoo Pass Expedition; Battle of Port Gibson; Battle of Raymond; Battle of Jackson; Battle of Champion Hill; Siege of Vicksburg (May 19 & May 22 Assaults); Battle of Chattanooga; Battle of Missionary Ridge; Atlanta campaign Sherman's March to the Sea; Carolinas campaign (one company); Battle of Bentonville (one company)

The 8th Missouri Infantry Regiment (aka the "American Zouaves") was an infantry regiment in the Union army during the American Civil War. Among its early leaders were Morgan Lewis Smith and Giles Alexander Smith, both of whom later became generals.

== Service ==
The 8th Missouri Infantry Regiment was formed in St. Louis, Missouri, in the early summer of 1861. The regiment was a special project supported by General Nathaniel Lyon. Most of the volunteers in Missouri's early regiments were German immigrants, and Lyon supported the creation of a regiment of "native-born Americans" to demonstrate that the Union cause in Missouri had support beyond the German-American community. Ironically, the Eighth Missouri also ended up with a high percentage of immigrants. Many of its members were Irish Americans who had worked on the Mississippi River docks prior to the war, giving the regiment a distinct Celtic personality (an ironic result considering Lyon's goal of an ethnically "American" regiment).

In addition to its St Louis recruits, several companies were actually raised in other states. The Illinois and Minnesota volunteers joined the Eighth Missouri because their home state's quota for enlistments was full. The Eighth Missouri wore a distinctive uniform patterned after those of the French-North African Zouave units. While most of the Zouave uniform elements were abandoned as the war progressed, the 8th Missouri apparently continued to wear their short, brightly decorated Zouave jackets throughout the war.

The regiment's first commander was Col. Morgan Lewis Smith, a New Yorker who had moved west to Missouri after serving as an enlisted man in the Regular Army. Under his firm hand, the 8th Missouri would become one of the finest units to serve in the Army of the Tennessee. M. L. Smith's brother, Giles Alexander Smith, also served in the regiment.

The 8th Missouri saw extensive service during the first three years of the war in the Trans-Mississippi Theater and Western Theater, and built for itself an enviable reputation on the battlefield. The regiment first fought in Missouri in the summer of 1861 against pro-Southern guerrillas who were attacking U.S. Army supply trains—for example, in Wentzville, Missouri. That autumn, the 8th Missouri participated in the Federal occupation of Paducah, Kentucky.

In February 1862, the regiment fought its first major battle, the Battle of Fort Donelson, near Dover, Tennessee. Later that spring, it was heavily engaged in the second day's fighting at the Battle of Shiloh. After a two-month-long campaign, it was the first regiment to enter the strategic rail center of Corinth, Mississippi, following the Confederate evacuation in May 1862, and in late December. From July 1862 until December they were stationed in Memphis and acted as a Provost Guard. In one is the notable incidents while in the city a group of people were heavily drinking before getting rowdy and violently assaulting each other, leaving one dead. Members of the regiment were soon summoned to the area and quickly broke down the door to the establishment. The soldiers were immediately hit by chairs, charcoal and small arms fire. One of the men was killed and several were left wounded. After seeing their comrade killed the soldiers quickly started shooting up the building killing five of the men and leaving seven wounded, three of them later succumb to their wounds and died. The man who shot the soldier successfully got away from the area, but the next day was caught by the soldiers and hung outside a local hospital. It took part in the Battle of Chickasaw Bayou. In January 1863, it stormed the breastworks of Fort Hindman to capture Arkansas Post.

The 8th Missouri saw considerable service in the Battle of Vicksburg, where eleven men of the regiment won the Medal of Honor in one day during the May 22, 1863, assault on Stockade Redan. The regiment marched on to participate in the Battle of Jackson, the Battle of Chattanooga, and the opening phases of the Atlanta campaign.

On June 25, 1864, the three-year enlistments of most of the regiment's members expired and they returned to their homes. Those who remained on active duty were consolidated into a battalion of two companies, and as such participated in the rest of the Atlanta Campaign and Sherman's March to the Sea. In February 1865, the remaining veterans of the 8th Missouri were attached as an extra company to the 6th Missouri Infantry. In this capacity, they took part in the Carolinas campaign and the Grand Review of the Armies in Washington, D.C., before being mustered out of service in June 1865.

== Notable members ==
- Eight were awarded the Medal of Honor for their actions on May 22, 1863, during the Siege of Vicksburg:
  - John G. K. Ayers — Participating in this diversionary "forlorn hope" attack on Confederate defenses.
  - Matthew Bickford — Participating in the "same forlorn hope."
  - James S. Cunningham — Participating in the "same forlorn hope."
  - David H. Johnston — Participating in the "same forlorn hope."
  - John O'Dea — Participating in the "same forlorn hope."
  - William Reed — Participating in the "same forlorn hope."
  - Howell G. Trogden — Participating in the "same forlorn hope."
  - John W. Wagner — Participating in the "same forlorn hope."
- Ephraim Shay — Mechanical engineer and later creator/designer of the Shay Locomotive.
- Giles Alexander Smith — Union General
- Morgan Lewis Smith — Union General

== See also ==
- List of Missouri Union Civil War units
