= Morgan Lewis Smith =

United States Army officer (1822–1874)

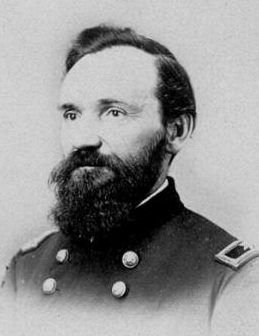
- Born: March 8, 1822; Oswego County, New York
- Died: December 29, 1874 (aged 52); Jersey City, New Jersey
- Burial place: Arlington National Cemetery
- Military career
- Allegiance: United States of America; Union
- Branch: United States Army; Union Army
- Service years: 1861–1865
- Rank: Brigadier General
- Commands: 8th Missouri Infantry Regiment
- Conflicts: American Civil War: Battle of Fort Donelson; Battle of Shiloh; Battle of Chickasaw Bayou; Battle of Chattanooga; Battle of Atlanta

Morgan Lewis Smith (March 8, 1822 – December 29, 1874) was a Union brigadier general in the American Civil War

== Biography ==
Smith was born in Oswego County, New York. In 1843, he settled in Indiana, and later had some military experience in the United States Army. At the outbreak of the Civil War he raised the 8th Missouri Infantry Regiment, of which he was elected Colonel in 1861. He commanded a brigade at the capture of Fort Donelson, and performed well at Shiloh. At these two battles his losses included only dead and wounded, none missing or captured. This was a testimony to Smith's leadership, considering other commands lost thousands to skulkers and prisoners during both battles. In mid-May Smith was transferred to command the 1st Brigade in William T. Sherman's division. Smith's brigade took an active part in the siege of Corinth being the lead brigade in the fight for Russell's House and the attack on the double log house.

On July 19, 1862, Smith was appointed brigadier general of volunteers, to rank from July 16, 1862. He served under Sherman in the Vicksburg Campaign. At the Battle of Chickasaw Bayou he received a severe wound, from which he would not recover until October 1863. He rejoined the Army of the Tennessee before Chattanooga.

He led his division in the battle of Chattanooga, and in the following year's Atlanta campaign. During the Battle of Atlanta he temporarily commanded the XV Corps when John A. Logan assumed command of the Army of the Tennessee after James B. McPherson's death. He returned to command his division at the battle of Ezra Church but was soon forced to leave active field command due to complications from his wound received at Chickasaw Bluffs. Afterwards he was placed in charge of Vicksburg. General Sherman said of M.L. Smith, "He was one of the bravest men in action I ever knew."

After the Civil War Smith served as U.S. Consul in Honolulu, Hawaii, 1866–1868. He died at Jersey City, New Jersey on December 29, 1874, and was buried at Arlington National Cemetery. His brother, Giles Alexander Smith, was also a Union general. His daughter Louise Morgan Sill (1867–1961) was a poet, editor, and translator based in Paris.

== See also ==
- List of American Civil War generals (Union)
