= Louise Morgan Sill =

American poet

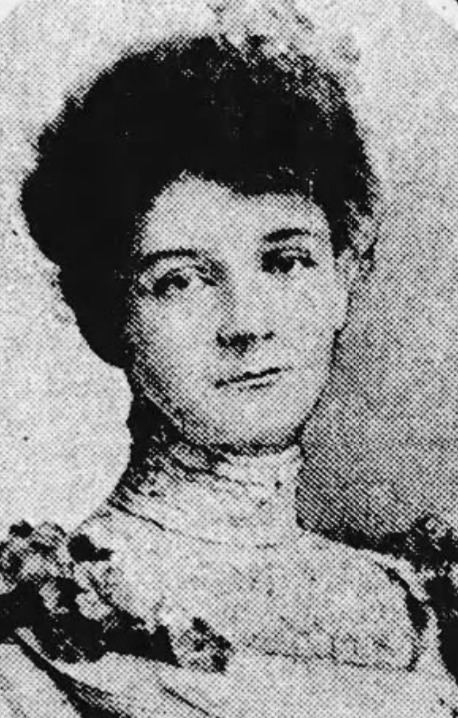
- Louise Morgan Sill, from a 1906 newspaper
- Born: Louise Morgan Smith; December 18, 1867; Honolulu, Hawaiian Islands
- Died: March 31, 1961 (age 93); West Palm Beach, Florida, U.S.
- Occupations: Poet, writer, editor, translator
- Father: Morgan Lewis Smith
- Relatives: Giles Alexander Smith (uncle)

Louise Morgan Smith Sill (December 18, 1867 – March 31, 1961) was an American poet, writer, translator, and editor.

== Early life and education ==
Smith was born in Honolulu, and raised in Washington, D.C., the daughter of Morgan Lewis Smith and Louise Genella Smith. Her father was a brigadier general in the Union Army during the American Civil War. At the time of her birth, her father was the United States ambassador to Hawai'i, then an independent kingdom.

== Career ==
Sill wrote poems that appeared in several major magazines, including Scribner's and The Atlantic. "Almost everyone writes nowadays," wrote one reviewer of her 1906 collection In Sun and Shade, "but few have written anything very much better in serious poetry than Louise Morgan Sill." She was an editor on the staff of Harper's Magazine from 1905 to 1910. During World War I she worked at a hospital in France. She translated works from French in the 1910s and 1920s, and wrote monthly reports on the Paris art scene for The American Magazine of Art.

== Publications ==
- "The 'Flying Dutchman'" (1899, poem, The Century)
- "Man and Woman" (1899, poem, The Century)
- "The Canyon of the Colorado" (1901, poem, Harper's Weekly)
- "Out of the Shadow" (1903, poem, North American Review)
- In Sun or Shade (1906, poems)
- "The Clue" (1906, poem, Harper's)
- "The Hoof-Beats of the Years" (1907, poem, North American Review)
- "Sunnyfield" (1909, story for young readers)
- "The Gossip of an Ambassador" (1911, article)
- "Music" (1912, poem, North American Review)
- "The Cascade" (1913, poem, North American Review)
- "The Old Waman" (1915, poem, Scribner's)
- "After Battle" (1918, The Atlantic)
- Paul Claudel, The Tidings Brought to Mary (1916, translated from French by Sill)
- Henry Bordeaux, Guynemer, Knight of the Air (1918, translated from French by Sill)
- Charles Marc des Granges, An illustrated history of French literature (1921, translated from French by Sill)
- The Life of Lives; the story of Our Lord Jesus Christ for young people (1922)
- "A Garden...There" (1922, poem, North American Review)
- "Time is Not" (1925, poem, The Commonweal)
- "The Rearranged Luxembourg" (1926, article)
- Ernest Dimnet, The Brontë Sisters (1927, translated from French by Sill)
- The Hell-Gods and Other Poems (1928)
- "Paris: Mother of Students" (1928, article)
- "Paris Notes" (1932, article)

== Personal life ==
Smith married George Imbrie Sill and lived with him in Central America. They divorced in 1908. She lived in Paris for much of her adult life, and died in 1961, at the age of 93, in West Palm Beach, Florida.
