= John W. Wagner =

Medal of Honor recipient (1837–1896)

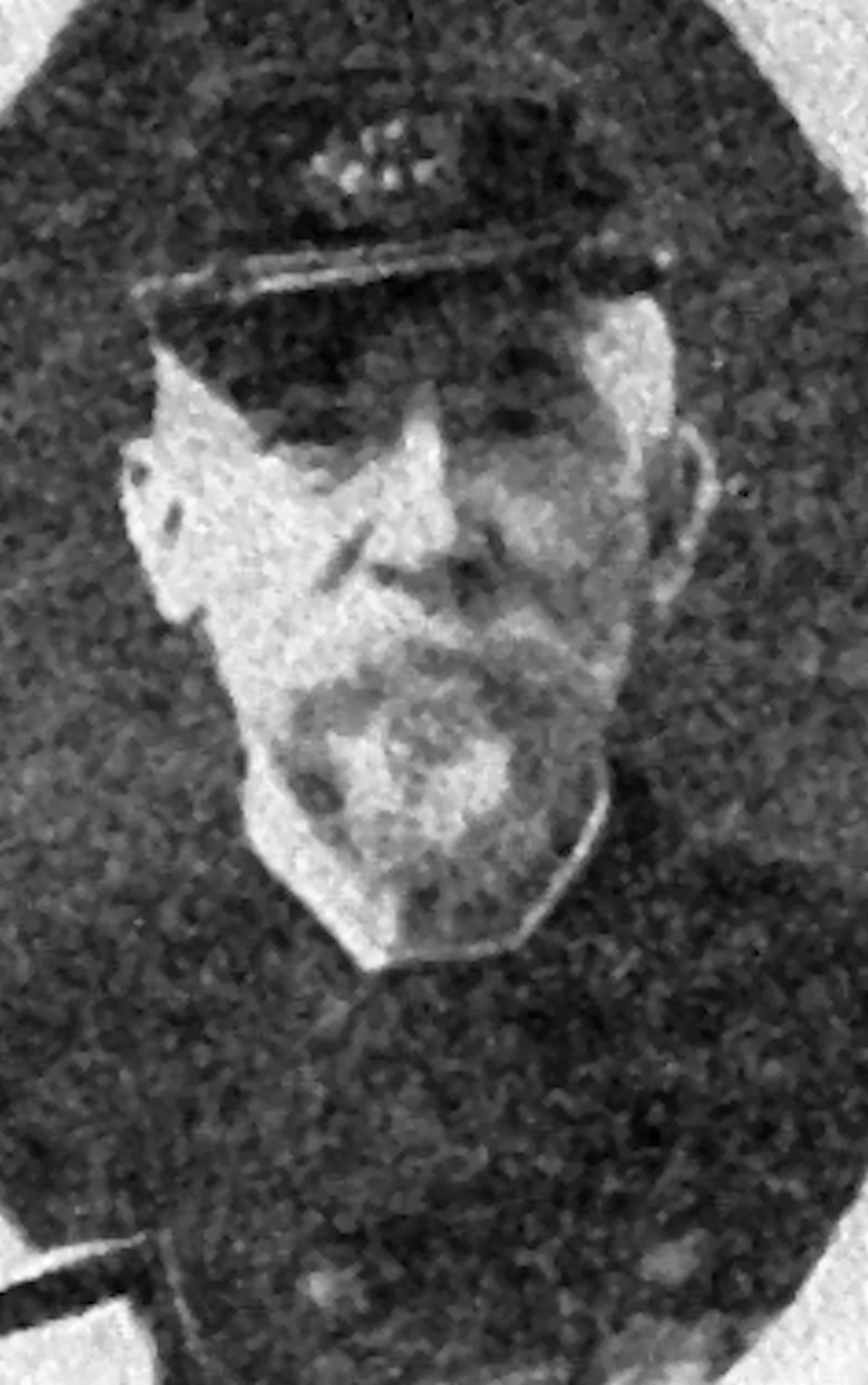
- Born: c. 1837; Clear Spring, Maryland
- Died: August 24, 1896
- Burial place: Jamaica Plains, Massachusetts
- Military career
- Allegiance: United States of America
- Branch: United States Army
- Rank: Corporal
- Units: Company F, 8th Missouri Infantry Regiment
- Conflicts: American Civil War; Battle of Vicksburg
- Awards: Medal of Honor

John W. Wagner (c. 1837 – August 24, 1896) was a Union Army soldier in the American Civil War who received the U.S. military's highest decoration, the Medal of Honor.

Wagner was born in Clear Spring, Maryland, and he entered service in St. Louis, Missouri. Wagner was awarded the Medal of Honor for his actions at the Battle of Vicksburg on May 22, 1863, for his gallantry in the charge of the volunteer storming party as a corporal with Company F of the 8th Missouri Infantry.

His Medal of Honor was issued on December 14, 1894, and Wagner died in 1896 and was buried in Jamaica Plain, Massachusetts.

== Medal of Honor citation ==
The President of the United States of America, in the name of Congress, takes pleasure in presenting the Medal of Honor to Corporal John W. Wagner, United States Army, for gallantry in the charge of the volunteer storming party on 22 May 1863, while serving with Company F, 8th Missouri Infantry, in action at Vicksburg, Mississippi.
