= Cill =

Cill or CILL may refer to:

- Cill or sill, in water navigation, a horizontal ledge in a lock
- Continental Indoor Lacrosse League, a senior men's box lacrosse league in the United States

== See also ==
- Sill (disambiguation)
