= William Reed (Medal of Honor) =

Soldier and veteran of the American Civil War

- Born: February 21, 1839; Union County, Pennsylvania, United States
- Died: May 30, 1918 (aged 79); Huntingdon, Pennsylvania, United States
- Burial place: Riverview Cemetery, Huntingdon, Pennsylvania
- Military career
- Allegiance: United States
- Branch: United States Army; Union Army
- Rank: Private
- Units: Company H, 8th Missouri Volunteer Infantry
- Conflicts: Battle of Vicksburg
- Awards: Medal of Honor

William Reed (February 21, 1839 – May 30, 1918) was an American soldier who fought for the Union Army during the American Civil War. He received the Medal of Honor for valor.

== Biography ==
Reed received the Medal of Honor on December 12, 1895, for his actions at the Battle of Vicksburg on May 22, 1863, while with Company H of the 8th Missouri Volunteer Infantry.

== Medal of Honor citation ==
Citation:

The President of the United States of America, in the name of Congress, takes pleasure in presenting the Medal of Honor to Private William Reed, United States Army, for gallantry in the charge of the volunteer storming party on 22 May 1863, while serving with Company H, 8th Missouri Infantry, in action at Vicksburg, Mississippi.

== See also ==
- List of American Civil War Medal of Honor recipients: Q–S
