= Drucilla Roberts Bickford =

American politician (1925–2024)

Member of New Hampshire House of Representatives
- In office 1980–1982
- In office 1988–1992

Personal details
- Born: October 4, 1925
- Died: February 23, 2024 (aged 98)
- Party: Republican

Drucilla Roberts Bickford (October 4, 1925 – February 23, 2024) was an American politician. She served three terms in the New Hampshire House of Representatives. Bickford was a member of the New Hampshire Republican Party.
