= Essington Lewis =

Australian businessman

Essington Lewis CH
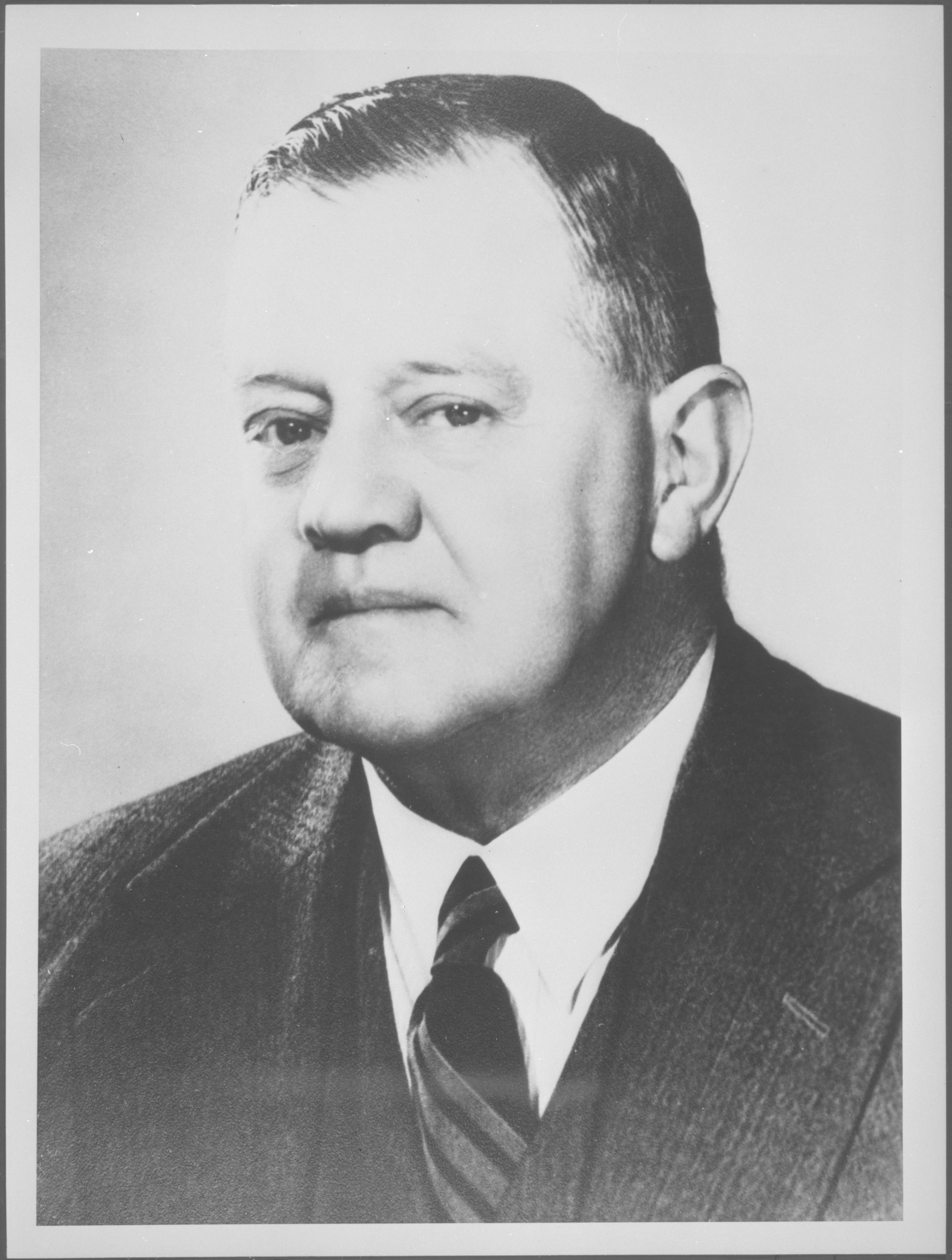
- Lewis, c. 1945
- Born: 13 January 1881; Burra, South Australia
- Died: 2 October 1961 (aged 80); Tallarook, Victoria, Australia
- Education: St Peter's College, Adelaide; South Australian School of Mines
- Occupation: Mining engineer
- Years active: 1904–1961: employee, 1904–1926; managing director, 1926–1950; chairman, 1950–1961
- Employer: BHP
- Spouse: Gladys Rosalind Cowan (m. 1910)
- Children: 5
- Parents: John Lewis (father); Martha Brook (mother)
- Relatives: Tom Lewis (nephew); Sandy Lewis (nephew); James Cowan (father-in-law); Darcy Rivers Warren Cowan (brother-in-law)

Essington Lewis CH (13 January 1881 – 2 October 1961) was an Australian industrialist. He was the Director-General of the Department of Munitions and Director-General of the Department of Aircraft Production during World War II.

== Biography ==
=== Early life ===
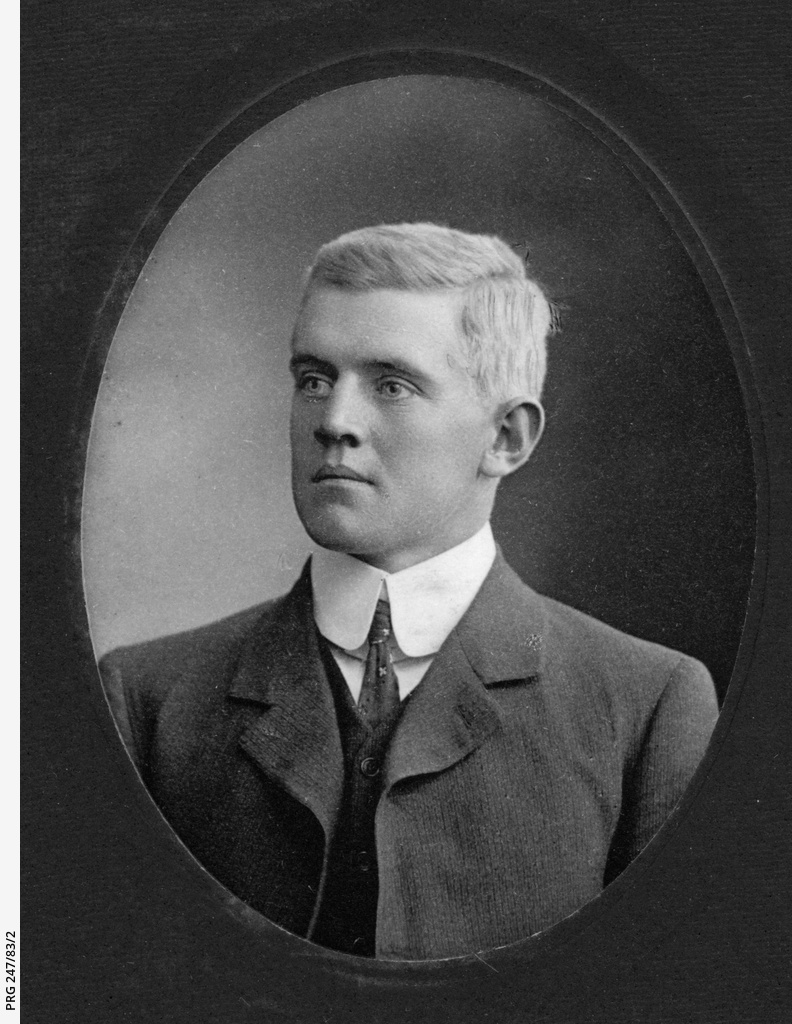
Lewis c. 1900

Essington Lewis was born in Burra, South Australia on 13 January 1881. His father was the pastoralist and politician John Lewis (1844–1923), founder of Bagot, Shakes & Lewis. He was named after Port Essington, where his father owned a cattle property. He was educated at St Peter's College, Adelaide and the South Australian School of Mines.

=== Career ===
After joining BHP in 1904, he rose through the company ranks to become managing director in 1926 and chairman in 1950, a position he held until his death in 1961. For the whole of his period as managing director, he had a close working relationship and personal friendship with the chairman of directors, Harold Gordon Darling (1885–1950).

During his travels to Germany and Japan in the 1930s, he realised the threat of these countries to Australia. Accordingly, with Darling, he helped establish the Commonwealth Aircraft Corporation and many munitions facilities meaning Australia was better prepared for industrialisation when the war started in 1939. During World War II, he also served as Director-General of the Department of Munitions and Director-General of the Department of Aircraft Production. He supported the establishment of the motor industry in Australia in 1948, being rewarded by being able to purchase the first commercially produced Holden 48-215.

He was appointed a Companion of Honour on 24 September 1943 for his work as Director – Munitions & Aircraft Production in WWII.

A South Australian Railways broad gauge 520-class steam locomotive - No. 523 - was named the "Essington Lewis". It entered service on 14 August 1944.

=== Personal life ===
In 1910, he married Gladys Rosalind Cowan OBE, the only daughter of James Cowan; and they had five children – sons James Essington Lewis and Robert Brook Lewis AM, and daughters Helen Clarke, Mary Munckton OAM and Jane Nevile. His sons were educated at Geelong Grammar School and the daughters at the Clyde School. Two children died in infancy - David and Janet. The family lived in Malvern, Victoria and owned a country property named "Landscape" near Tallarook in central Victoria. Robert Brook (1918–2009) is notable as being the Master of St Mark's College, University of Adelaide from 1957 to 1968 and the Master of Menzies College, La Trobe University from 1968 to 1970.

=== Death ===
Lewis died while riding his horse on his property "Landscape" near Tallarook on 2 October 1961, aged 80 years. Newspapers of the day claimed he suffered a heart attack. St John's Anglican Church, Toorak, was overflowing for his funeral; he was cremated.

=== Legacy ===
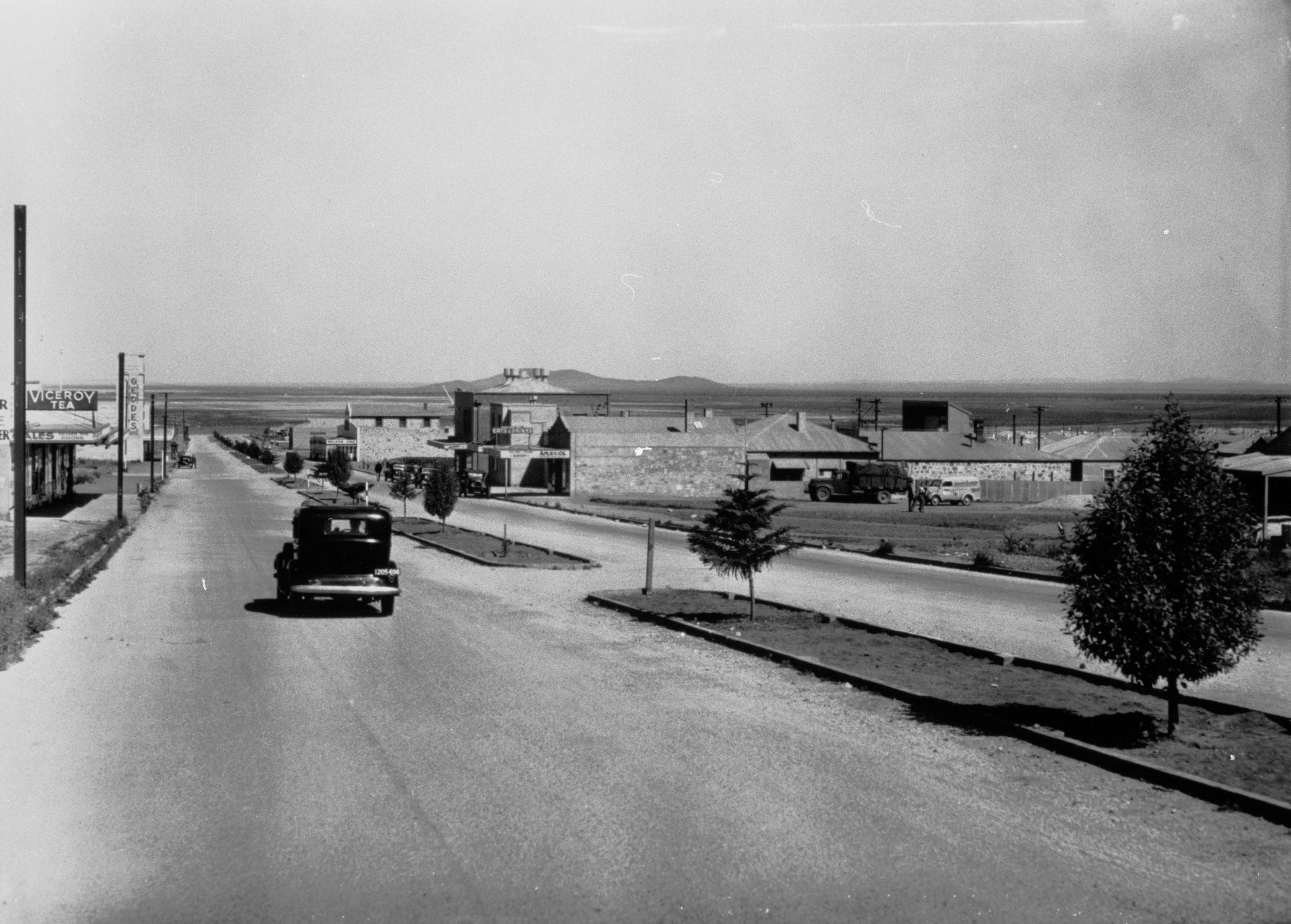
Essington Lewis Avenue in Whyalla

His life is the subject of several books, including by historian Geoffrey Blainey, another by Clive Turnbull, and the musical play I am Work by John O'Donoghue. Since its establishment in 1975, the Essington Lewis Memorial Lecture has been presented annually in South Australia, funded by BHP and was instituted by the Adelaide Branch of the Australasian Institute of Mining and Metallurgy. One of Whyalla's main streets, Essington Lewis Avenue, was named in his honour.

== Extneral links ==
- "Essington Lewis' Holden". National Museum of Australia. Archived from the original on 3 December 2008.

Government offices
New title	Director-General, Department of Munitions; 1940–1945	Succeeded by John Jensen as Secretary, Department of Supply and Development
New title	Director-General, Department of Aircraft Production; 1942–1945	Succeeded by John Jensen as Secretary, Department of Supply and Development
