= Giles Alexander Smith =

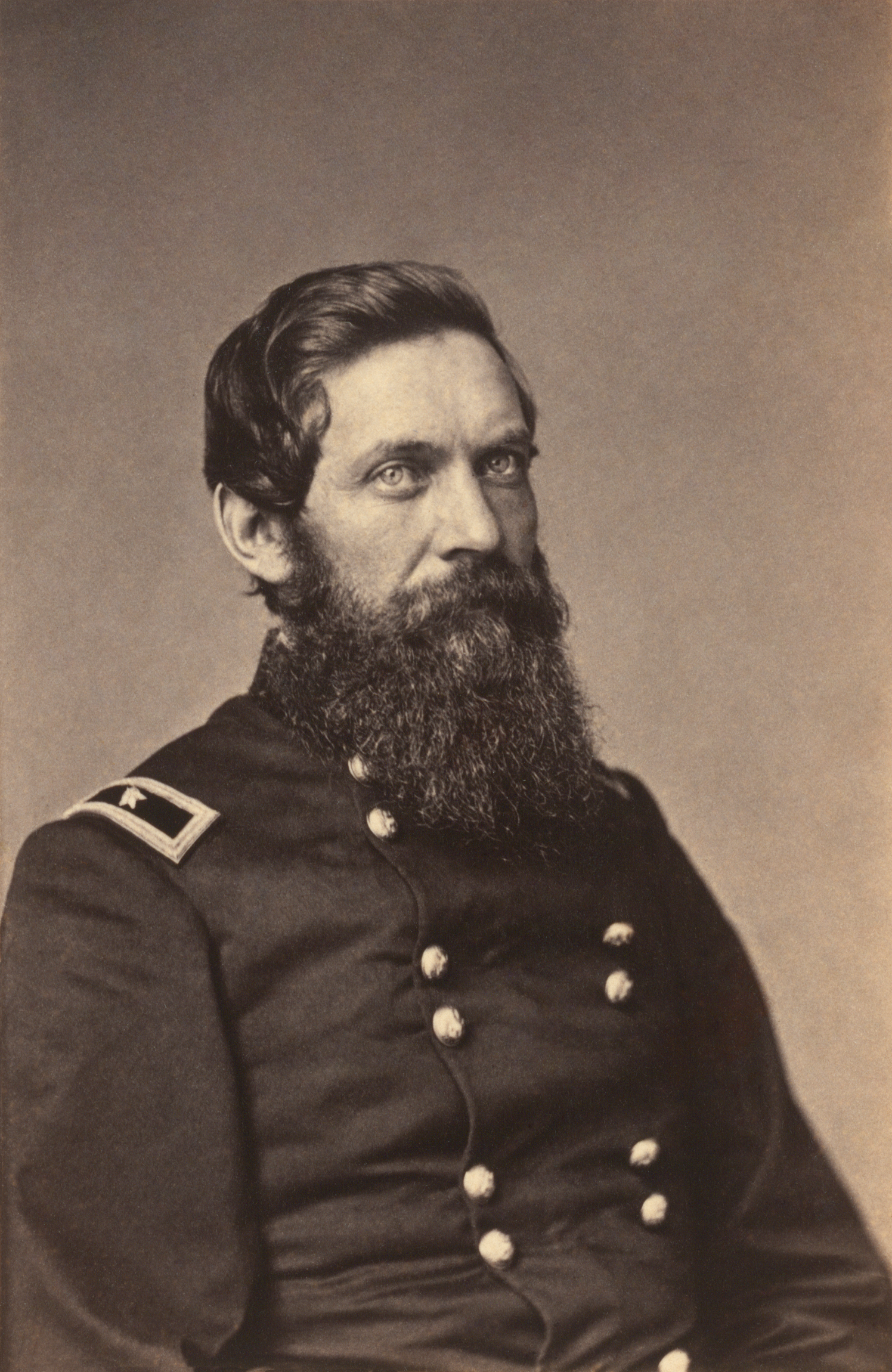
- Giles Alexander Smith, circa 1864, by the Webster Brothers
- Born: September 29, 1829; Jefferson County, New York
- Died: November 8, 1876 (aged 47); Bloomington, Illinois
- Burial place: Evergreen Memorial Cemetery, Bloomington, Illinois
- Military career
- Allegiance: United States of America; Union
- Branch: United States Army; Union Army
- Service years: 1861 - 1866
- Rank: Major General
- Commands: 8th Missouri Infantry Regiment
- Conflicts: American Civil War

Giles Alexander Smith (September 29, 1829 – November 8, 1876), was a general in the Union Army during the American Civil War.

== Biography ==
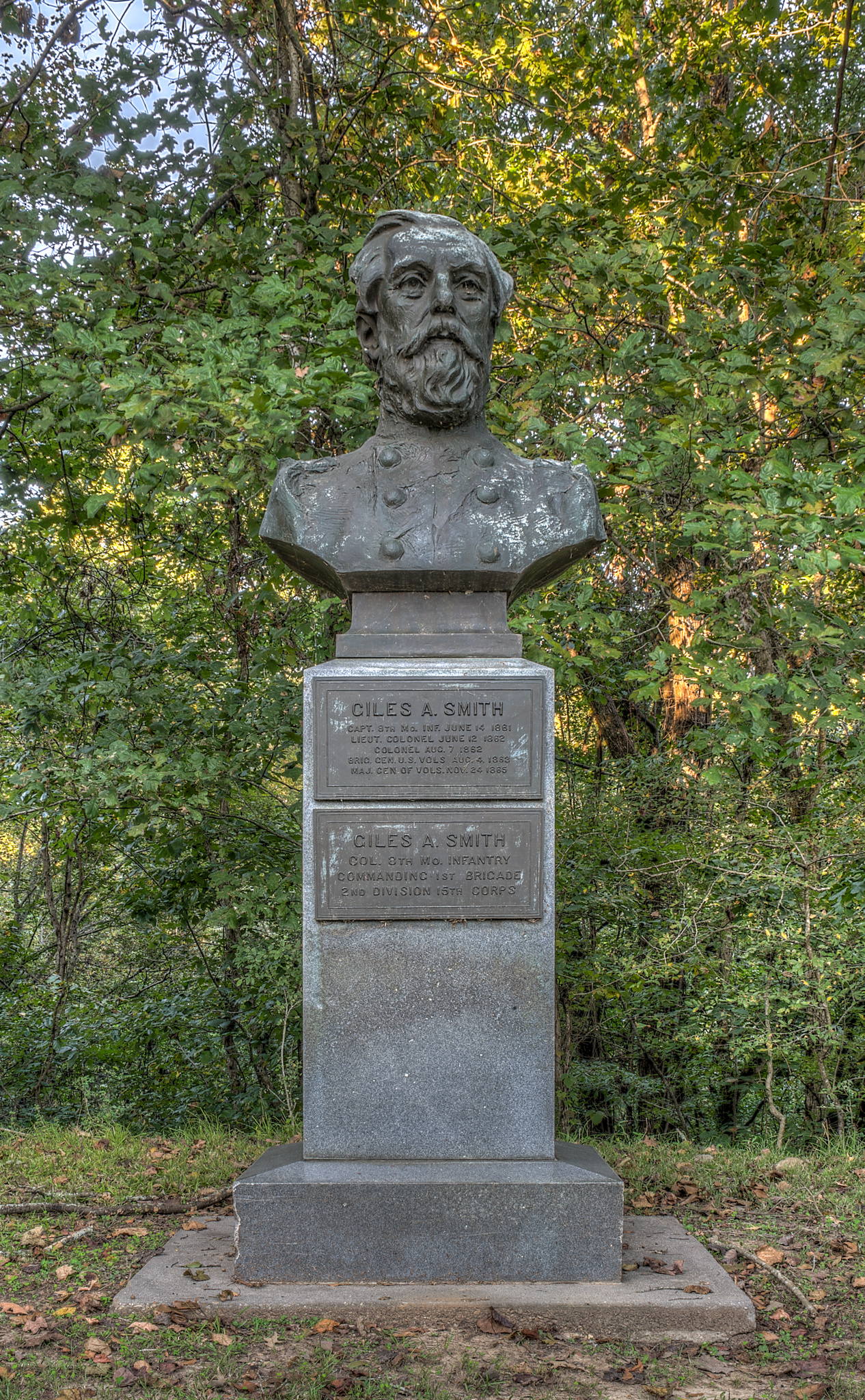
Bust of Smith by Solon Borglum at Vicksburg National Military Park, 1913

Smith was born in Jefferson County, New York. When he was 18, he moved to southwestern Ohio, and for a decade engaged in business in Cincinnati. In the late 1850s, he moved to Bloomington, Illinois, where he was proprietor of a hotel.

At the beginning of the Civil War, he joined the 8th Missouri Infantry Regiment, in which he became a captain. He took part in the capture of Fort Donelson, the Battle of Shiloh, and the operations against Corinth, becoming, later in 1862, colonel of a regiment which he led at Chickasaw Bayou. After the final campaign against Vicksburg, on August 4, 1863 he was appointed brigadier general of volunteers to rank from August 4, 1863. He was wounded at the Third Battle of Chattanooga. He took part in the Atlanta campaign, the March to the Sea and the Carolinas campaign. He was appointed to the rank of major general of volunteers on November 24, 1865, the last one based on seniority for the Civil War.

His brother Morgan Lewis Smith was a Union Army brigadier general of volunteers.

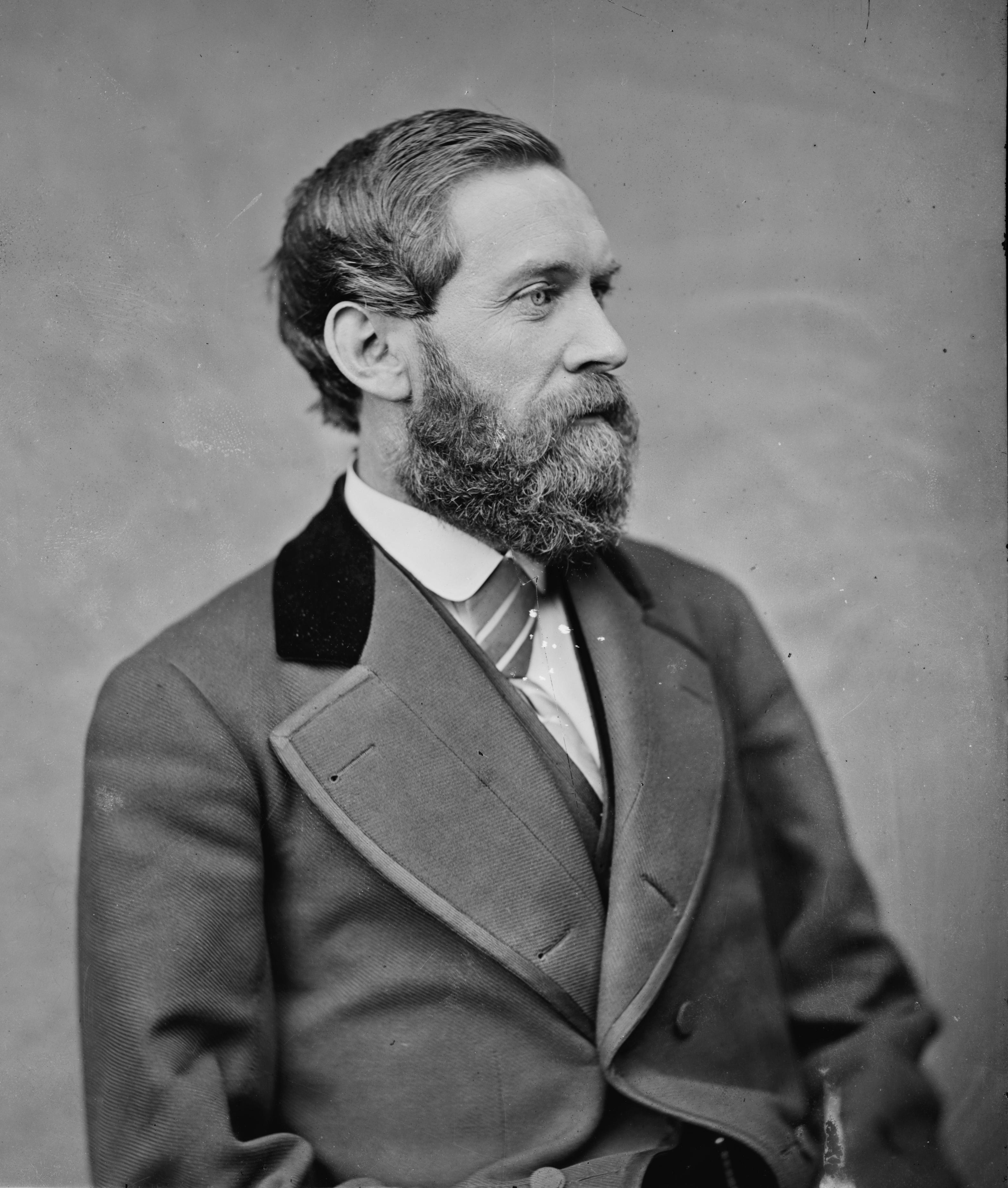
Photograph from the Brady-Handy collection

After the war, Smith declined the offer of a colonelcy in the Regular Army. He was mustered out of the volunteers on February 1, 1866. He was subsequently engaged in Illinois politics, retiring from public life in 1872. Smith was an Illinois delegate to the Republican National Convention. He moved to California in 1874 in a futile attempt to improve his health, but returned to Illinois two months before his death. He died at Bloomington, Illinois, and was buried in Bloomington Cemetery.

== See also ==
- List of American Civil War generals (Union)
