= Matthew Bickford =

Medal of Honor recipient (1839–1918)

- Born: 1839; Peoria County, Illinois
- Died: 1918 (aged 78–79); Washington
- Burial place: Bayview Cemetery in Bellingham, Washington
- Military career
- Allegiance: United States of America; Union
- Branch: Union Army
- Rank: Corporal
- Unit: 8th Missouri Infantry Regiment - Company G
- Conflicts: American Civil War
- Awards: Medal of Honor

Matthew Bickford (1839–1918) received the Medal of Honor for his actions during the American Civil War.

== Biography ==
He was born in Peoria County, Illinois in 1839. He entered service at "Trivolia", Peoria County, Illinois. He was a Corporal, in Company G, 8th Missouri Infantry Regiment, Union Army. He received the Medal of Honor for Gallantry in the charge of the "volunteer storming party" at Vicksburg, Mississippi, May 22, 1863.

Bickford moved to Washington state around 1907. He died in 1918, and is buried in Bayview Cemetery in Bellingham, Washington.

== Medal of Honor citation ==
- Rank and organization: Corporal, Company G, 8th Missouri Infantry.
- Place and date: At Vicksburg, Miss., May 22, 1863.
- Entered service at: Trivolia, Peoria County, Ill.
- Birth: Peoria County, Ill.
- Date of issue: August 31, 1894.

Citation:

Gallantry in the charge of the "volunteer storming party."

== See also ==
- List of American Civil War Medal of Honor recipients: A–F
