= History of Bickford's Australia =

Australian beverage maker

Wm. Bickford, chemist
- Industry: Pharmacist, pharmaceutical chemist
- Founded: 1839
- Founder: William Bickford
- Headquarters: Adelaide, South Australia
- Key people: William Bickford; Ann Margaret Bickford

A. M. Bickford & Sons
- Type: Partnership
- Industry: Pharmaceutical chemist, beverage manufacturer
- Founded: 1864
- Founder: Ann Margaret Bickford
- Headquarters: Adelaide, South Australia
- Key people: Ann Margaret Bickford; William Bickford (jr.); Harry Bickford

A. M. Bickford & Sons Ltd
- Type: Limited liability company
- Industry: Pharmaceutical chemist, beverage manufacturer
- Founded: 1903
- Headquarters: Adelaide, South Australia

Bickford's Australia Pty Ltd
- Type: Limited liability company
- Industry: Beverage manufacturer
- Founded: 1991
- Headquarters: Salisbury South, South Australia
- Key people: Angelo Kotses
- Owner: Kotses family
- Website: www.bickfords.net

A. M. Bickford and Sons was one of the first manufacturing chemists in South Australia. Until 1930, it was one of the State's most significant family-owned companies. In 1930, they amalgamated with half a dozen other similar Australian companies to form "Drug Houses of Australia" (DHA), which continued to produce "A. M. Bickford and Sons" products: "drugs" and "chemicals" under the DHA brand; and cordials and soft drinks under the "A. M. Bickford and Sons" brand.

In the late 1960s, DHA became the target of a corporate raider and asset stripper. By the mid-1970s DHA had collapsed under the burden of servicing the imposed level of debt. What was left was split up and sold. Reckitt & Colman acquired the major "drugs" and "chemicals" product and brands, while other parts of the company were acquired by others. Melburnian Peter Abbott purchased the pharmacy products, eucalyptus oil operations, and soft drink products. The pharmacy products were on-sold; the eucalyptus oil operations were incorporated into "FGB" (Felton Grimwade & Bickford). The soft drink products continued under the revived "A. M. Bickford and Sons" brand. In the late 1980s, FGB decided to concentrate on their "core businesses" under the FGB brand, and sold the soft drink businesses and the Bickford brand names, which by this stage had been established for over a century. The history of the Bickford's products and company names between 1987 and 1999 is not clear.

In 1999 the soft drink business and company names were purchased by the Kotses family. "Bickford's" once again became a South Australian family-owned business, known for its range of cordials and flavourings. These are made today by Bickford's Australia.

== Foundation & establishment (1839–1864) ==
=== William Bickford (1815–1850) ===
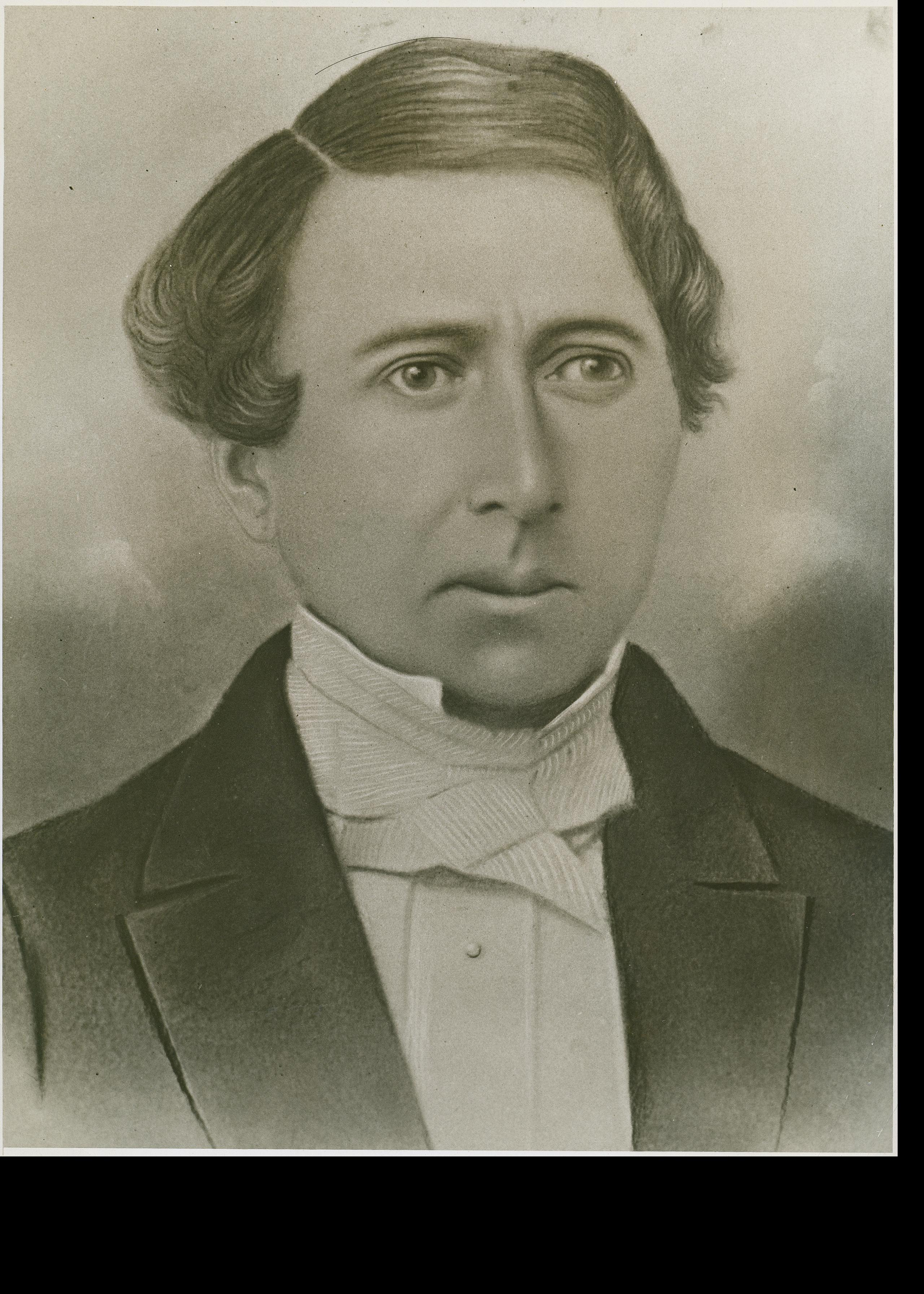
William Bickford Sr. (1815–1850)

William Bickford (18 August 1815 – 11 September 1850) was the seventh child (of fourteen) of a well-to-do couple of West Alvington of Devon, England. When Bickford's father died, the greater part of his fortune went to his eldest son by an earlier marriage. William's family was provided for, but had to work to secure their future. For the fifteen-year-old William, that meant taking an apprenticeship to Mr Buxton, a druggist.

In September 1838, aged 23, the chemist's assistant left England from Plymouth, rounded the Cape of Good Hope in December, and arrived in Port Adelaide on 15 February 1839 on the barque Platina. Though he aspired to become a shepherd in South Australia, soon after his arrival he began working as assistant in the dispensary attached to the North Terrace surgery of one Dr Bright at a salary of 40/- (£2) a week with board and lodging provided. On 18 August 1839, his 24th birthday, he married Ann Margaret Garrett, whom he had met on the trip from Portsmouth. They were soon expecting their first child, but it died shortly after birth on 6 June 1840, and Ann was seriously ill for some time. In March 1840, William wrote that Dr and Mrs Bright had left the colony for New Zealand, (leaving William to deal with his creditors), and that he had secured another position as manager of a retail shop and dispensary owned by a partnership of two surgeons, at a salary of £3 per week.

Despite an economic downturn in the colony, his business thrived. He left the security of the dispensary and by September 1840 had opened his own shop in Hindley Street near Rosina Street with borrowed capital of £220. It, too, prospered, and soon he moved into larger premises at 67 Hindley Street opposite Club Lane. As business flourished, the wholesale lines became the larger part of the firm's business.

In April 1841 he wrote "Business is going on prosperously, and I have a comfortable home at my own fire side and a good wife, who studies my interest in every respect". Ann was very supportive of her husband and was able to keep his shop running during any forced absence, jury duty for instance. Their first son, William, was born on 19 November 1841, followed by Harry in February 1843, and Elizabeth in November 1844. In December 1845 they lost a baby, (Eulalia), so William decided to move his family away from the unsanitary conditions of the city. He purchased 16 acres (6.4 ha) of land at Glen Osmond, "just 3 miles from the Adelaide city centre", and in the winter of 1846 built a house, later to be called "Benacre", moving the family there before the onset of the next summer. He commuted daily to his business in the city. They lost another baby, (James), in 1848, but Edward was born in 1849.

William was concerned with the development of Adelaide. In 1847 he was one of the founders of the South Australian Institute (alongside others, including a business competitor Francis Faulding).

In February 1850, William wrote that he had established a garden and had planted fruit trees and vines. However, he did not live to enjoy the fruits, dying on 11 September 1850 at the age of 35 of "brain fever", after a 3-day illness, leaving his wife pregnant (with Mary) and with four young children, (William, Harry, Elizabeth and Edward) to care for.

=== Ann Margaret Bickford ===
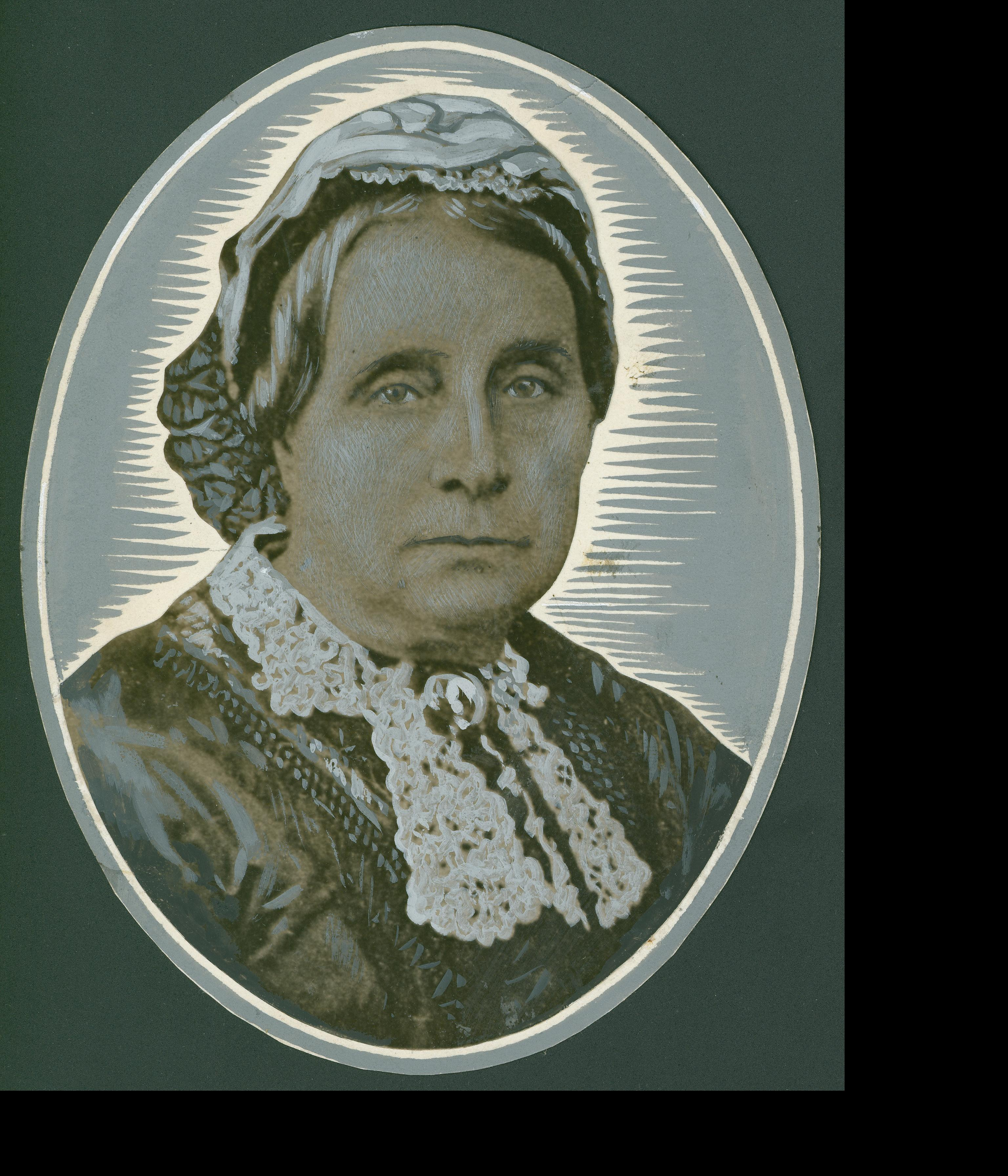
"Anne" Margaret Bickford (née Garrett 1810–1877)

Ann Margaret Bickford (née Garrett) (1810 – 24 January 1877) was determined to carry on her husband's business. With five children under the age of ten, she enrolled the help of a retired pharmacist Mr Paxton to 'hold the fort' until more permanent help could be found. She soon engaged qualified chemists Edwin Page and Robert Hutton, and "with their able assistance" carried on the business for 14 years. (Mr Hutton was to open a pharmacy of his own at 76 Rundle Street in 1863.) On 29 May 1865 the shop shifted yet again – to 19 Hindley Street, later the site of Tattersall's Hotel. Early 1873 they opened a shop in Taylor Street, Kadina. It ceased being advertised in 1888.

Remarkably, her death was marked in the newspapers of the time with the most cursory of death notices and no more. Whatever funeral arrangements there might have been were not advertised. A vault at West Terrace Cemetery bears the names of both Ann and William Snr. A nearby stone commemorates Charlotte Jane Bickford.

=== Second generation ===
The second generation were:

- unnamed Bickford on 6 June 1840
- William Bickford (19 November 1841 – 20 September 1916)
- Harry Bickford (24 February 1843 – 6 September 1927
- Elizabeth "Bessie" Bickford on 29 November 1844 – England)
- Eulelia Bickford (8 November 1846 – 25 February 1847)
- James Bickford (19 February 1848 – 29 February 1848)
- Edward Bickford (30 May 1849 – 7 January 1907, Brooklyn, New York, United States)
- Mary Bickford (25 April 1851 – 12 December 1882 Bournemouth, England)

The children's education did not suffer. They were already studying at the Adelaide Educational Institution, an academy run by J. L. Young in Freeman Street, and continued there for some years. Harry (or Henry as he was then called), was thriving there in 1853. Both he and Edward were mentioned at the prizegiving in 1855 Harry kept a close association with his alma mater, being president of the Adelaide Educational Institution Old Scholars in 1866.

Although not as academically inclined, William must have made his mark as he was prominent in the Institution's 1863 welcome to "old scholars" W. P. Auld, James Frew and Stephen King, returning members of the Stuart's sixth expedition which had successfully crossed Australia from south to north.

==== William Bickford (1841–1916) ====
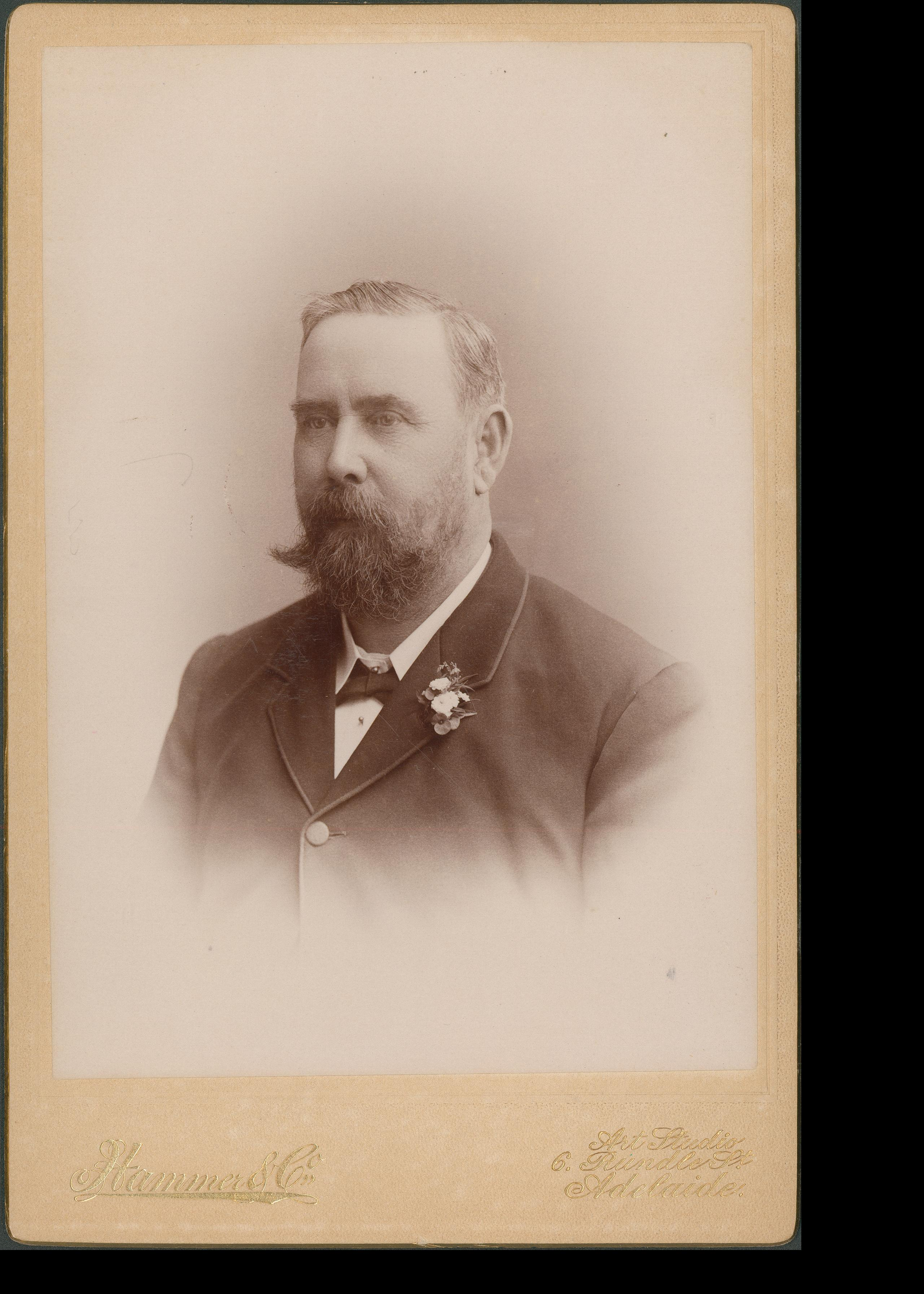
William Bickford Jr. (1841–1916), ca.1900

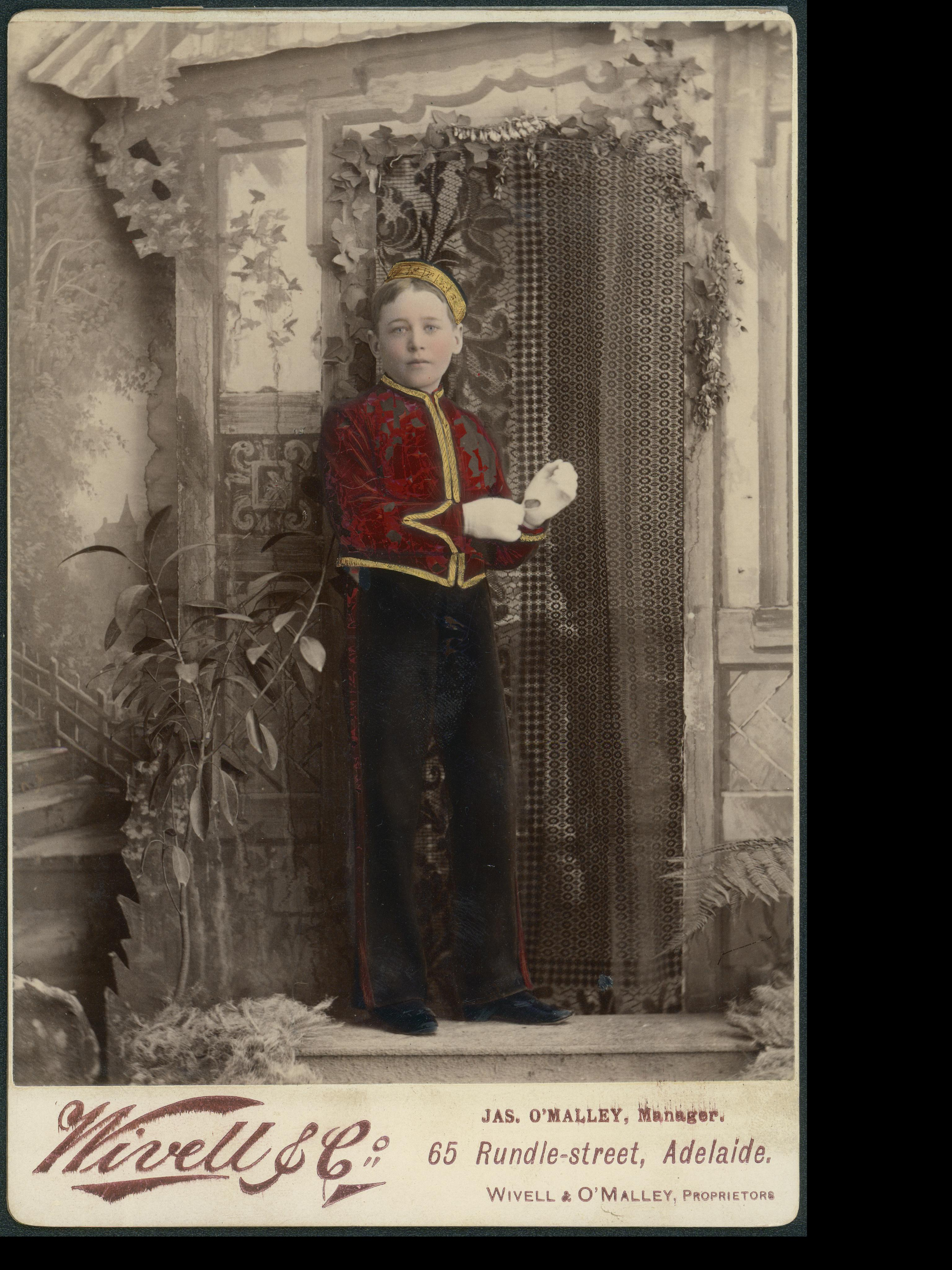
Harold Bickford (1876–1958), 1887 – son of William Jr.

Older son William Bickford (jr.) (19 November 1841 – 20 September 1916), being less academically inclined than Harry, gained experience travelling and picking up a variety of jobs.

In 1871 he married Margaret Jane Ferguson. They had seven children:

- William Ferguson Bickford "Willie" (30 November 1871 – 22 June 1889) died aged 17 in riding accident
- Sidney Bickford (10 August 1874 – 10 December 1938) moved to Perth in 1895.
- Harold Bickford (16 May 1876 – 23 October 1958) Managing director A. M. Bickford & Sons Ltd 1908–1930? He married Tessie Veronica Murphy in 1916; they had one child, Ronald Ferguson Bickford (1918–2011); he divorced her in 1922 citing four co-respondents, including Napier K. Birks (1876–1953) of the prominent Birks family.
- Evelyn Victoria Bickford (later Mrs Robert Ezekiel Reid of Geelong) (b.7 June 1878)
- Reginald Bickford (26 January 1880 – 20 November 1948) m. Rosa Florence Cudmore (30 September 1879 – 22 July 1954) on 17 November 1910
- Norman Forsyth Bickford (1881 – )
- Leslie Bruce Bickford (b.30 December 1885 at Alvington) m. Dorothy Murray

Their first home was "Fairfield" in Somerton, followed by "Alvington" near the Brighton Esplanade (see chapter below). Both William and Harry sent their sons to St Peter's College, a tradition that was largely continued in following generations.

He was made Justice of the Peace in 1886 and elected president of the Justices' Association from 1903 to 1904. He was elected to Brighton council and Mayor of Brighton 1886–1887 and 1890–1891. He was president of the Adelaide Chamber of Commerce from 1894 to 1895.

He and brother Harry bought Burnside Station near Naracoorte in 1886, and though neither ever lived there, they installed a manager and visited frequently. The fine merino wool produced there always found a ready buyer. By the turn of the century they had decided to free themselves of the responsibility, so after the South Australian Government showed no interest at their price of £49,540, subdivided the 40,978 acres into 28 lots and put them up for auction on 23 October 1908.

==== Harry Bickford (1843–1927) ====
Her son Harry Bickford (24 February 1843 – 6 September 1927) (He may have been christened "Henry".) was sent to England in 1859 to gain qualifications and experience as a chemist, and returned in 1863.

He took little interest in civic affairs, but was a keen horseman and was Master of the Adelaide Hounds from 1882 and a committeeman with the South Australian Jockey Club from 1889. He was a crack shot, and won significant trophies for pigeon shooting.

When the company was floated on the Stock Exchange in January 1903, he was elected first managing director, relinquishing the position to his nephew Harold in 1906.

He was married three times: on 24 February 1866 to Charlotte Jane Farr (c. 1842 – 4 September 1866). They had no children. He married again, on 10 March 1870 to Rosina Mary Ferguson (1845 – 5 October 1898). They had three children:

- (Isabella) May Bickford (12 April 1872 – 28 July 1933) (never married)
- H(arry) Fairweather "H.F." Bickford (1874 – 8 July 1906) married May Innes-Ker (1876 – 22 August 1906) on 18 March 1903. They had no children.
- Harding William Bickford (14 January 1877 – 5 August 1919) (never married)

On 8 December 1904 he married Priscilla Simms (née Chambers) (c. 1852 – 17 November 1924) They had no children. Priscilla was a daughter of John Chambers (1814–1889).

The two brothers were also major investors in the "Paramatta" copper mine at Moonta in the late 1890s.

== A. M. Bickford & Sons (1864–1930) ==
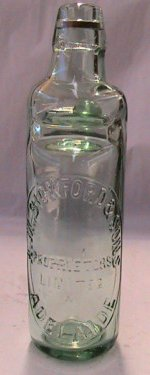
An AM Bickford & Sons "marble bottle" for aerated water

=== Bickford & Son (1864–1871) ===
In 1863, Harry, now qualified, returned from England and began working for her. On his 21st birthday, she formally took him into partnership with her as 'Bickford and Son'. She drew up a deed, dated 23 February 1864, for a seven-year agreement whereby she held a two-thirds interest, and Harry a one-third interest.

=== A. M. Bickford & Sons (1871–1903) ===
William was not ready to be tied down, and travelled about the State in a multitude of occupations. Seven years later, he was ready to join the business and a new Deed of Trust was drawn up in 1871 for the new partnership 'A.M. Bickford and Sons'. William took the role of manager and promoter of the business.

=== Expansion and move into wholesale ===
With the continued expansion of the wholesale and manufacturing side of the business, the retail arm was sold around 1870, and substantial offices and warehouse were built at 42–46 Currie Street (on the Leigh Street corner), which remained the company's headquarters from 1879 until well into the 20th Century; the building was still standing in 2010.

In 1872 they built the South Australian Cordial Factory on the north side of Waymouth Street where, under Stephen Bickford (about whom little is known), a range of cordials was manufactured, principally lime juice cordial, raspberry vinegar and raspberry balm, but peppermint, cloves, lemon, sarsaparilla, orange bitters, stomach bitters, Canadian bitters and quinine wine were also produced. Production commenced in 1874, and Bickford's Australia labels continue to carry the Bickford's logo which states: "Since 1874". In 1876 the factory was expanded and became the South Australian Cordial and Aerated Water Factory with Mons. H. Foureur in charge of the aerated drinks. Mons. Foureur had previously run a similar factory in Glenelg but like the equipment over which he presided, was of French origin.

With the mother's death in 1877, the two sons continued and expanded the business. William maintained personal contact with important and potential clients statewide, and along the Murray as far as Wentworth and then up the Darling to Wilcannia, a 3-month journey he executed twice per year "for some years". Harry was in control at Hindley Street. He served as the first President of the Pharmaceutical Association of S.A. and was known as a sportsman, being Master of the Adelaide Hunt Club for many years.

=== Alvington ===
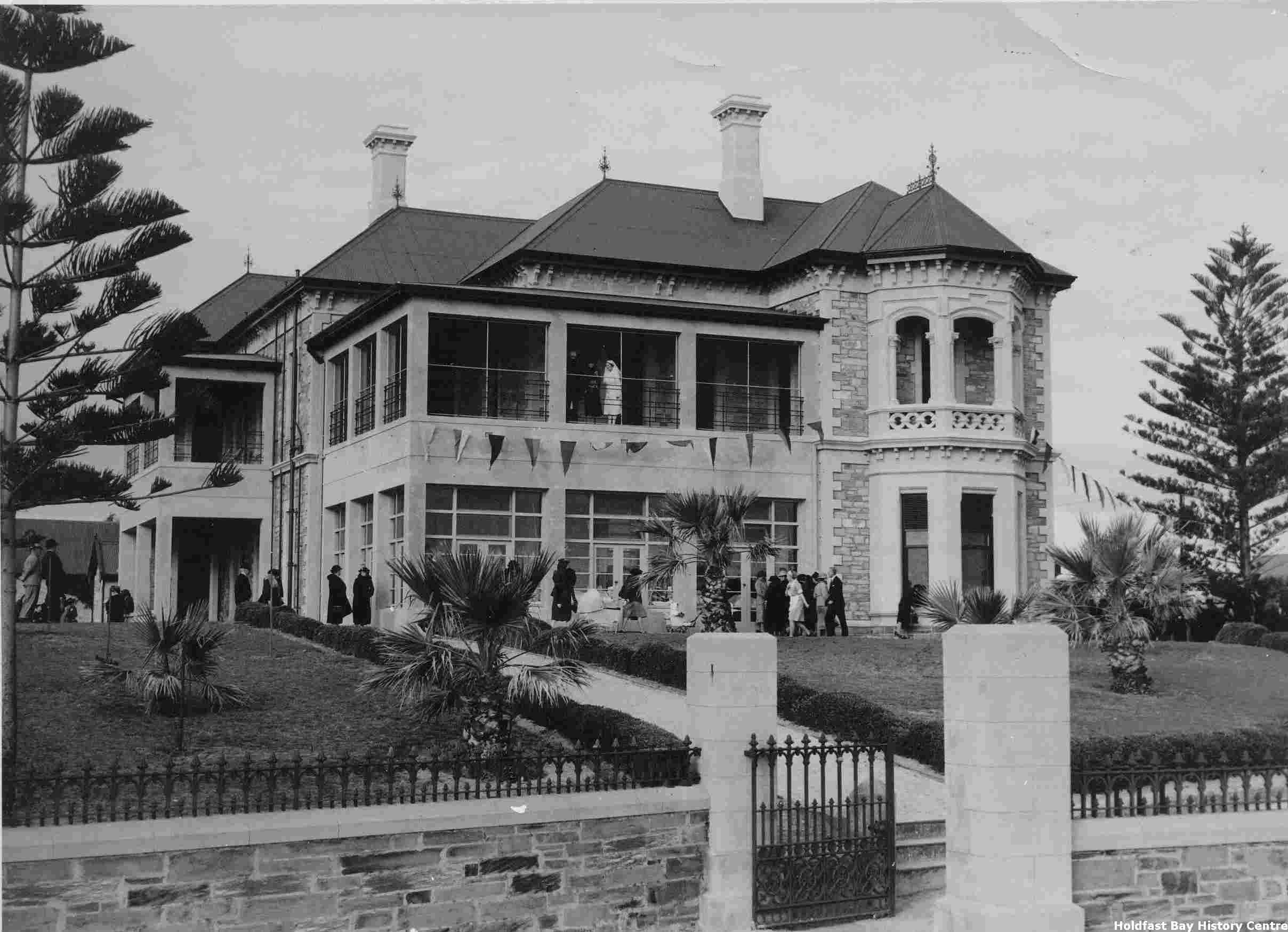
Somerton Crippled Children's Home, about 1939

Around 1880, with business prospering and his family expanding, William built a substantial residence "Alvington" at New Glenelg (now Somerton Park) on a property with a beach frontage of 160' and depth of 360' (49m x 110m) at the corner of The Esplanade and Madge Terrace (now Bickford Terrace). It was named after West Alvington, the home village of his grandparents, and the location to which his sister Elizabeth had "migrated". William Bickford did not live long to enjoy its grandeur, and on his death in 1918 left his widow Margaret and son Harold with a substantial overdraft. They were able to maintain a gracious lifestyle however, retaining a coachman and other servants.

In the period 1938–1976, Alvington became "Somerton Home" of the Crippled Children's Association, an organisation created to support children with poliomyelitis. In 1976 the children were transferred to a new facility at Regency Park. The property was then sold and the building demolished.

=== Third generation ===
Sidney Bickford (10 August 1874 – 10 December 1938), second son of William (jr.), opened the Perth branch.

Harold Bickford (1876–1958) succeeded his father William (jr.) as managing director.

Harding William Bickford (14 January 1877 – 5 August 1919), youngest son of Harry, was in his youth a prominent cyclist. After a few years' work in the company laboratories he left for London in 1898 to gain qualifications as a pharmacist, and on return to Adelaide in 1903, was employed as assistant lecturer at the University of Adelaide. then as manager of A. M. Bickford & Sons' offices in Sydney then Brisbane, where he died of pneumonia.

Reginald Bickford (26 January 1880 – 20 November 1948) a younger son of William (jr.), was in charge of the Cordial and Aerated Waters factory for many years, succeeding one Stephen Bickford, about whom little is known but was not of the immediate family.

Leslie Bruce Bickford (born 30 December 1885), youngest son of William (jr.) became manager of the Surgical and Veterinary Department.

=== Felton Grimwade & Bickford Ltd. (1902–1930) ===
In 1895 the partnership decided to expand west, and sent Sidney Bickford and Robert McClure, an experienced hand from the Adelaide firm to set up a Perth branch. They were in direct competition with Felton Grimwade & Co. of Melbourne and after a few years decided to amalgamate.

In 1902, Felton Grimwade & Bickford Ltd. was founded in Western Australia. It was a joint venture between Felton Grimwade & Co, Melbourne and A.M. Bickford & Sons, Adelaide, with Robert McClure their first managing director. Sidney Bickford married a Perth girl and settled down, breaking most ties with the Adelaide firm and family.

=== A. M. Bickford & Sons Ltd (1903–1930) ===
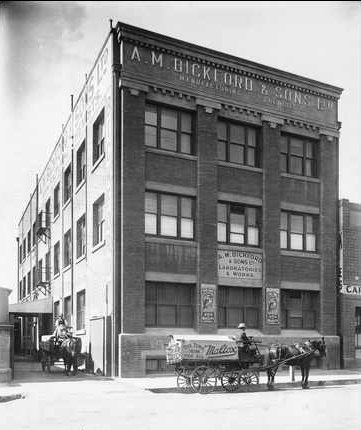
A.M. Bickford & Sons Ltd, Laboratories & Works, Waymouth Street, 1916

In 1903 the firm became a limited liability company A. M. Bickford & Sons Ltd.

In 1914 the manufacturing laboratory was transferred to Waymouth Street alongside the cordial factory. Facilities installed included a large (6'6" or 1.9m diameter) autoclave, a bond store and plant for manufacturing absolute alcohol.

In 1920 its dental requisites branch was made a separate company Commonwealth Dental Supply Company Ltd. with headquarters in King William Street.

=== Products ===
In 1874, following the foundation of the South Australian Cordial and Aerated Water Factory and laboratories on Waymouth Street, the company began producing premium cordials and aerated drinks. Before long these quality products, including the now famous Bickford's Lime Cordial, gained international award recognition for their superiority.

"Maltox" was a "tonic" based on port wine with barley malt and beef extract added. Like its competitor Sedna it was susceptible to abuse for its alcohol content, and sales from chemist's shops and other unlicensed premises were subject to police "sting operations".

In 1920, Bickford's commenced production of branded Coffee and Chicory Essence, (later renamed Bickford's Iced Coffee Mix), winning the gold medal at the All-Australian Exhibition in 1930. These and other products are still made to the same original recipes today.

In 1922 Bickford's "Sal Vital", an effervescent "health salt" powder which "contains all the elements that tend to cool and purify the blood, and makes as well, a refreshing and cooling beverage", first went on sale.

== Drug Houses of Australia (1930–1974) ==
In 1930, a holding company Drug Houses of Australia (DHA) was formed with a capital of £5,000,000 which combined Bickford's with a number of similar Australian companies representing all states except Tasmania. No shares were offered to the public.

The companies involved were:
| A.M. Bickford & Sons Ltd, South Australia | Duerdin & Sainsbury Ltd, Victoria |
| Felton Grimwade & Bickford Ltd, Western Australia | Elliott Brothers Limited, New South Wales |
| Felton Grimwade & Co, Victoria | Taylors Elliotts Ltd, Queensland |
| Rocke Thompsitt, Victoria |

Pursuant to the amalgamation agreements, A.M. Bickford & Son Ltd shareholders received 4.6572 £1 Drug Houses of Australia Ltd shares for each £1 A.M. Bickford & Son Ltd share.

In 1956 D.H.A. (SA) Ltd. moved to new premises at 599 Port Road, West Croydon.

In 1961 Drug Houses of Australia's net profit after tax exceeded a million pounds.

In 1968, DHA was taken over by the corporate raider, asset stripper and now-defunct British bank Slater Walker. The remnant struggled on until 1974, at which point it was decided to break the company up and sell it. The major products including Dexcal, Sal Vital and Sapoderm were sold to Reckitt & Colman.

Peter Abbott purchased DHA Manufacturing Pty Ltd, which included the eucalyptus oil operations, the business name Drug Houses of Australia, as well as other business and trade names and products including Bickford's Lime Juice Cordial and Bickford's Coffee Essence. An office and warehouse was set up at 17 Capella Crescent, Moorabbin. The name Drug Houses of Australia and some of the pharmacy only products were on-sold to Australian Pharmaceutical Industries (API) NSW. Currently, DHA is listed on the Bombay Stock Exchange and is located in Singapore.

== Felton Grimwade & Bickford Pty. Ltd. (1975–1987) ==
In 1975 the name DHA Manufacturing Pty. Ltd. was changed to Felton Grimwade & Bickford Pty. Ltd. (FGB), one of the business names that had been taken over.

In 1987 FGB sold Bickford's Lime Juice Cordial and Coffee Essence, together with the business name A.M. Bickford & Sons. (It is not clear to whom they sold them.) FGB continue in business pursuing their other interests and using the FGB brandname, however the company name now appears to be Felton Grimwade & Bosisto's Pty Ltd.

== 1987–1999 – A. M. Bickford & Sons again ... ==
It is remarkably difficult to find anything definitive about this period, particularly the period 1987–1991, and it is not clear why.

At some time, (most likely 1987, but supporting evidence is yet to be located), the Lloyd Family (of Lloyd Helicopters / Lloyd Aviation / Pearl Aviation fame) purchased various companies and brands, etc., which allowed them to manufacture and sell soft drinks in general, and Bickford's Lime Cordial in particular, from somewhere in the Adelaide Hills. But to date, and somewhat peculiarly, no supporting evidence has been located.

According to the Bickford's Australia website, Angelo Kotses became involved with the Lloyds some time in the early 1990s.

In 1991 the company extended the premium cordial range to include blackcurrant syrup and other new flavours, and throughout the 1990s further expanded the range with "old style sodas", fruit juice flavoured mineral water, bottled water and other products.

== 1999– Kotses family: A. M. Bickford & Sons / Bickford's Australia ==
In 1999, the Kotses family bought the company.

In the early 2000s iced teas and milkshake mixes were added to the range of products.

In 2005, the cordial and soft drink related parts of the company, now called "Bickford's Australia", moved into "a new state of the art manufacturing facility" in Salisbury, South Australia. Since the move to the new manufacturing plant in 2005 the range of products has expanded considerably.

In 2006, Bickfords lime juice cordial was recognised by the National Trust of South Australia as a Heritage Icon. Into the second decade of the 21st century, the range of products continues to expand, along with the Bickford's Group which also includes Vok, Wheel & Barrow, and Karma Living.

In February 2014, Bickford's announced plans for a new distillery in the South Australian Riverland. The article states, (amongst other things), that the "key to Bickford's success has been buying unloved brands and working out ways to rebuild them".

== See also ==
- South Australian food and drink
