= Melville Birks =

South Australian medical practitioner and occupational health specialist

Melville Birks FRCS
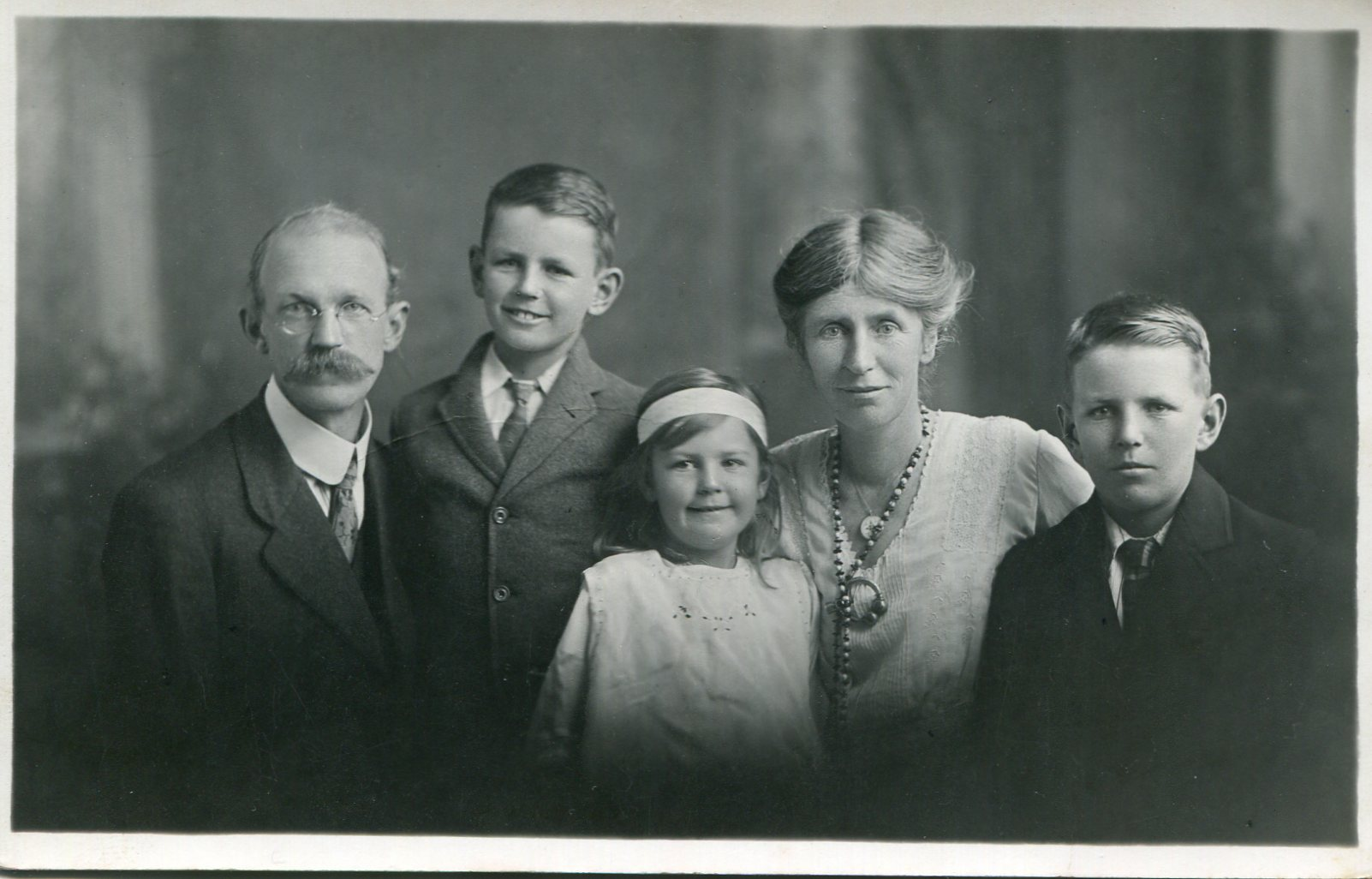
- Photo of Melville, Gordon, Joan, Netta and Peter Birks
- Born: January 30, 1876; Kent Town, South Australia
- Died: April 27, 1924 (aged 48); Rose Park, Adelaide, South Australia
- Occupations: Medical practitioner, surgeon
- Known for: Research on miners’ diseases and occupational health at Broken Hill
- Spouse: Janet Catherine "Nettie" MacIntyre
- Children: Peter Macintyre Birks; Walter Gordon Birks; Joan Birks
- Relatives: Lawrence Birks (brother)

Dr. Melville Birks FRCS, MB, BS, FRCP (30 January 1876 – 27 April 1924) was a South Australian medical practitioner and occupational health specialist remembered for his work in Broken Hill, New South Wales.

== History ==
Melville was born in Grenfell Street, Kent Town, South Australia, the second son of Walter Richard Birks (27 July 1847 – 4 May 1900) and his wife Jemima "Mina" Scott Birks, née Crooks (c. 1844 – 10 July 1926) who married on 29 April 1873.

Walter was a member of the highly successful Birks family whose retail stores and chemist's shops were a feature of Adelaide's Rundle Street.
For a year or two from 1869 Walter ran a general store in Kooringa, near Burra, specialising in bush clothing and groceries, then moved to Adelaide where he served as a junior partner of his famous brother Charles.
Walter and Mina moved house many times: over a twenty-five year period they occupied premises at Kent Town; Edward Street, Norwood; 7 Kensington Road, Norwood; St. Ann's Terrace, Glenelg, 1879–1883; "Silveracre" in Woodville 1883–1885; then "Cosford", a 27.5 acres (11 ha) property on Black Hill Road just past Glynde; then Edwin Street, Gilberton 1887–1888; and 17 Tynte Street, North Adelaide 1891–1892. At each move the family integrated into the local Wesleyan Methodist congregation, prominent in activities and taking responsible positions.
He owned other properties in premium locations, including a house in Third Street, Knightsbridge (now Leabrook) and in 1883 sold several blocks in Fullarton Estate.
In mid-1894 he and his brother John Napier Birks (1845–1929) helped establish a communist settlement at Murtho on the River Murray as part of the Village Settlement scheme, and acted as secretary of the Murtho Settlement Society. Five years later the settlement was deserted, all members having lost a great deal of money, the Birks brothers perhaps more than any other.
Walter, who had liquidated much of his assets (It was a condition of membership of the Murtho Association that each member contribute their entire wealth to the project) to invest in the scheme, died at Hewitt Avenue, Rose Park shortly after returning. His eldest son, electrical engineer Lawrence Birks returned from England too late for the funeral.

Jemima Crooks arrived in South Australia with her parents William (c. 1808 – 8 September 1887) and Ann Thompson Crooks née Thompson ( – 13 October 1875) in December 1872. Jemima's brother Alexander Crooks (23 September 1847 – 29 August 1943) married Emily Hannah Birks (1844 – 13 July 1926) on 18 September 1873

Melville Birks spent his early childhood in Murtho, one of the Village Settlements on the Murray River, in which experiment his parents lost their life savings. He received his early education at State schools and took a course in agriculture at Roseworthy College where he distinguished himself, gaining the silver medal as dux of his year in 1894. He was a quiet gentle boy with poor eyesight, not a genius like brother, but his ambitions lay in the medical field, and in 1896 went to Way College in order to matriculate. Through the generosity of a maiden aunt he was in 1899 able to embark on a medical degree course at the University of Adelaide, which he completed in five years, and incidentally proved to be an excellent rower. He gained his medical degree in 1902 and served a year as House Surgeon at the Adelaide Hospital, then spent three years in England and on the Continent, and was made a Fellow of the Royal College of Surgeons (F.R.C.S), which he gained despite needing to practice his profession while he studied. While in London he met Janet Catherine "Netta" MacIntyre, a daughter of Patrick B. MacIntyre of Findon, Roseshire of Crofters Commission fame. Janet had trained as a nurse at St Thomas' Hospital in London, and was appointed sister-in-charge of the Nightingale Training School and Home for Nurses (now Florence Nightingale School of Nursing and Midwifery), attached to that hospital.

They were married shortly afterwards and in 1908 returned to Australia, settling in Peterborough (then called Petersburg) where Melville practised in partnership with Dr. Goode from 1908 to 1913. While in Peterborough, he became interested in occupational diseases peculiar to railwaymen. He took a great interest in public affairs and gave lectures on health and other subjects for the Railway Town Men's Movement, and the Y.M.C.A and in his early days there often gave morning lectures at the old Socialist Hall. For a time he held the position of Mayor.

On 1 June 1913, he succeeded Dr. Seabrook as Superintendent of the Broken Hill Hospital. Here his efficiency and broad sympathy won him many friends, but his straightforward honesty aroused antagonism on both sides of the Union question, which was always to the fore in that town, often having to side with either the employer or employee in Workmen's Compensation cases. He volunteered to serve during The Great War, but was rejected on account of the essential nature of his position, but the War cost him in other ways, as he had to run the hospital with inadequate staff. He worked for long hours in the operating theatre, supported only by nursing staff.

While at "The Barrier" he did much important research work on miner's phthisis (silicosis) and lead poisoning. In 1919 he was granted a year's study leave and proceeded with his family to Great Britain, Europe, Canada and America studying diseases of miners. While in Brussels he read a paper on lead poisoning at a World Medical Conference. He resumed his post as Surgeon Superintendent of Broken Hill Hospital in September 1920 the following year but in August 1922, feeling out of sorts, he went for a holiday to the Eastern States, where in Wentworth he collapsed. He spent some time with his brother Walter Richard Birks (1886–1960), who was in charge of the Agricultural College at Dookie, Victoria, then to Melbourne, where his peculiar disease was diagnosed by Dr. Stawell, and was admitted to a private hospital where he was nursed for eleven months, then three months in Melbourne General Hospital. In December 1923 he returned to Adelaide, where four months later he died at his mother's home in Rose Park.

" No one can estimate the work of Dr Birks at Broken Hill both in bringing the hospital to a high state of efficiency and in establishing a fine training school for nurses. The idealism, the fine sense of honor, the devotion to duty of our "Head" could not fail to me the nurses under him regard their work as a high calling. Though the professional side came first it never overshadowed, or blotted out the human side. We were taught to regard ones patients as beings whom all our skill and care must be called on to relieve. He never sanctioned anything perfunctory in our mental approach of professional handling of patients impressions of her work directed by such a man is a gracious advantage for which a nurse can never be sufficiently grateful." ... Sister Graham of Broken Hill, who nursed him in the last weeks of his life.

"Dr Birks's two main interests during his life at Broken Hill were his surgical work at the hospital, and the study of social and economic problems as revealed by his close association with the workers. With regards to the first, there is no question that the high level of surgical work which Broken Hill now enjoys was due first and last to Dr Birks. He was a thoroughly sound, although slightly conservative surgeon, and was a master of asepsis, with the result that aseptic measures were, and still are, carried out at Broken Hill in a manner at least equal to that of any other hospital in Australia. A paper which he read before the South Australian branch of the British Medical Association, entitled 'The treatment of mine injuries at Broken Hill', was evidence of the remarkable results which he was able to obtain in many serious and mutilating conditions. His interest in the working class was shown by the frequent lectures which he gave before the various unions and the local branch of the Workers Educational Association. These were usually on some topic such as public health, with special reference to conditions at The Barrier as he knew them."

== Recognition ==
- The workers of Broken Hill presented his widow with a cheque for £500 (around $25,000 in today's values - 2025) in recognition of his service in that city. An illuminated address, intended to have been presented to him on his retirement, was also presented to her. It read in part:
  To Melville Birks, Esq., M.B., B.S., F.R.C.S. We, the undersigned, on behalf of the workers of Broken Hill desire to convey to you and hereby place on record our respect and admiration of your skill and training as a medical practitioner ... and our affection and esteem for you as a friend. During your 10 years' residence in Broken Hill ... you were uniquely placed to gain first-hand information of the conditions under which the workers of Broken Hill lived and toiled. Your intense humanity and strong regard for truth and justice made you friend and advocate of the needy and suffering, and no appeal on their behalf was ever made in vain. When ill-health compelled you to leave the Barrier we knew that we had lost a true and sympathetic friend and a strong and able advocate. We record, too, our appreciation of your efforts to banish ignorance by your presidency of the Workers' Educational Association, Barrier Branch, and your willingness to lecture in the cause of national and individual health and well-being. While occupying the position of medical referee under the Workers' Compensation Act of 1916 the workers felt assured that they would receive just and equitable treatment. It was with genuine regret that they learned of your retirement from the position. Our grief was deep and genuine when it was known that ill-health compelled you to resign the surgeon-superintendency of the Broken Hill and District Hospital, and our heartfelt wishes were for your complete restoration to health. If this is not to be we ask you to accept this evidence of our affection and esteem realising that your sojourn on the Barrier made for the physical and spiritual enrichment of the people. Your efforts have not been in vain, and there has been engendered a deep and abiding effect which time will not efface. The great living heart of Broken Hill goes out to you in your suffering and to your devoted wife and helpmeet.

The framed address was presented by the Birks family to the Broken Hill Trades Hall Trust.

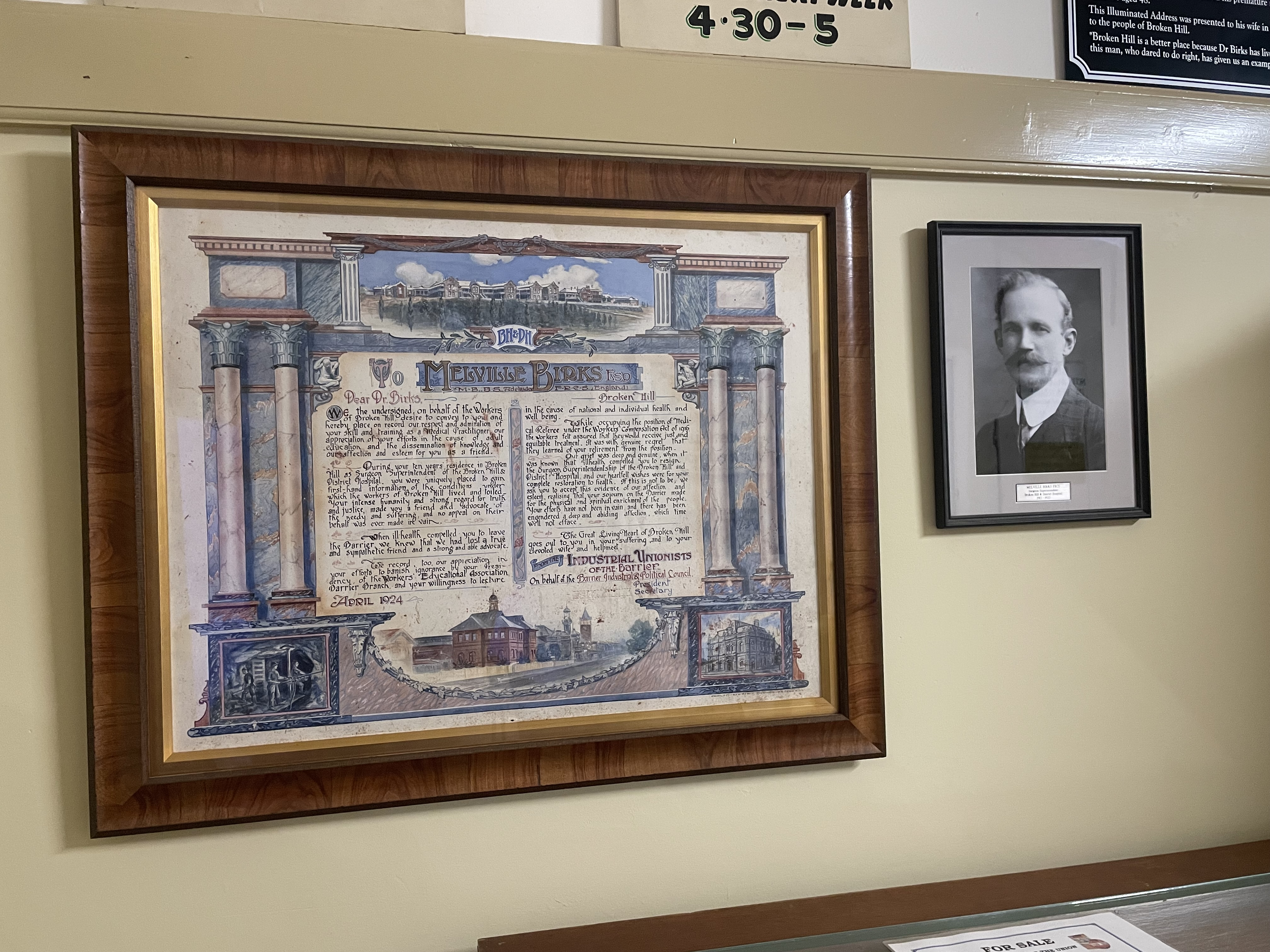
Illuminated tribute to Dr Melville Birks on display at Broken Hill Trades Hall

- A photograph of Dr Melville Birks is displayed in the foyer of the Broken Hill Hospital.
- A book was published in Broken Hill in 1924 commemorating his life and achievements.

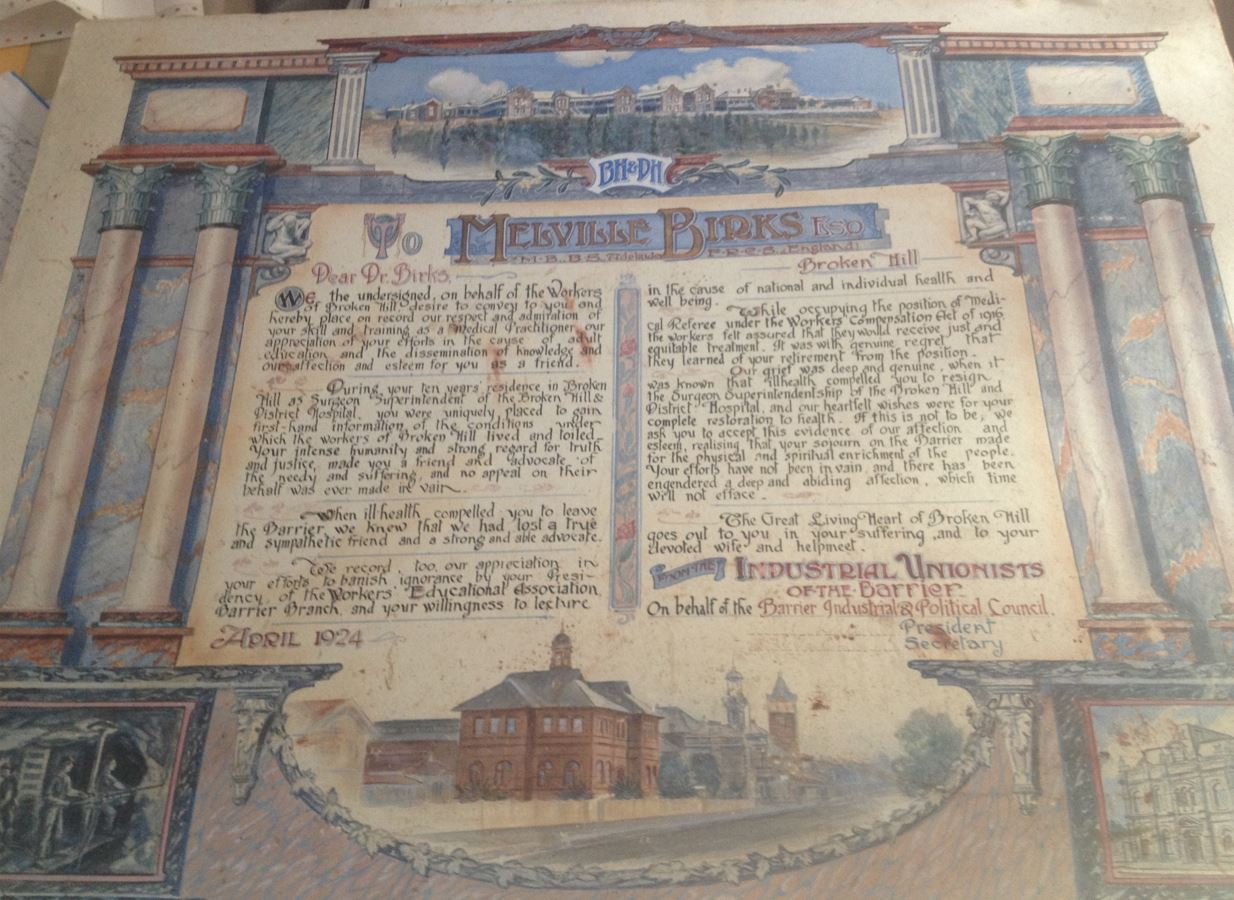
Photo of illuminated address

== Family ==
Walter Richard Birks, Sr. (1847–1900) arrived in South Australia with his parents and siblings from England in 1853. He married Jemima "Mina" Scott Crooks (1844–1926) on 29 April 1873. Among their children were:

- Lawrence Birks (1874–1924), an electrical engineer who did pioneering hydro-electric work in New Zealand
- Dr. Melville Birks (30 January 1876 – 27 April 1924) married Janet Catherine "Nettie" MacIntyre ( – ) on 5 March 1909. Their family included:

- Peter Macintyre Birks FRCS (16 January 1910 – ) married Betty Powell ( – ) on
- Walter Gordon Birks (11 November 1911 – 9 January 1997 ) married Vida Carr-West (31 August - 17 October 1983), lived Moe, Victoria, Australia
- Joan Birks (26 July 1915 – ) married Eric William Gray ( – ) on 5 March 1943, lived Oxford, England

- Walter Richard Birks (1886–1960), for a time principal of Roseworthy College.

For details on the extended family see George Vause Birks.
