= George Vause Birks =

Dr. George Vause Birks (c. 1815 – 31 January 1858) was a medical doctor who with his family emigrated to South Australia in 1853, and died there less than four years later. Their family was significant in the commercial life of the young city of Adelaide. Many of the Birks family were involved in William Lane's New Australia colony in Paraguay and others in the irrigation settlement at Murtho initiated by the Government on the River Murray, losing substantial sums in the failures of these Utopian ventures.

== History ==
Dr. George Vause Birks, his wife Hannah Napier Birks (6 May 1807 – 13 August 1883) and their family lived in Knutsford, near Manchester, England, and emigrated to South Australia on the Leonidas, arriving at Glenelg, South Australia in December 1853. They settled in Angaston, where he began practicing. He died four years later, as a result of being thrown from his horse. Mrs Birks then ran a store in Angaston, assisted by her sons William and George, who as W. H & G. N. Birks later opened a stationery shop and Birks Chemists in Rundle Street, Adelaide. Another son, Charles, opened a drapery store which became a major Adelaide department store.

== Family ==
This list is not exhaustive but is intended to show the relationship of all members of the family likely to be encountered in Wikipedia and local histories.

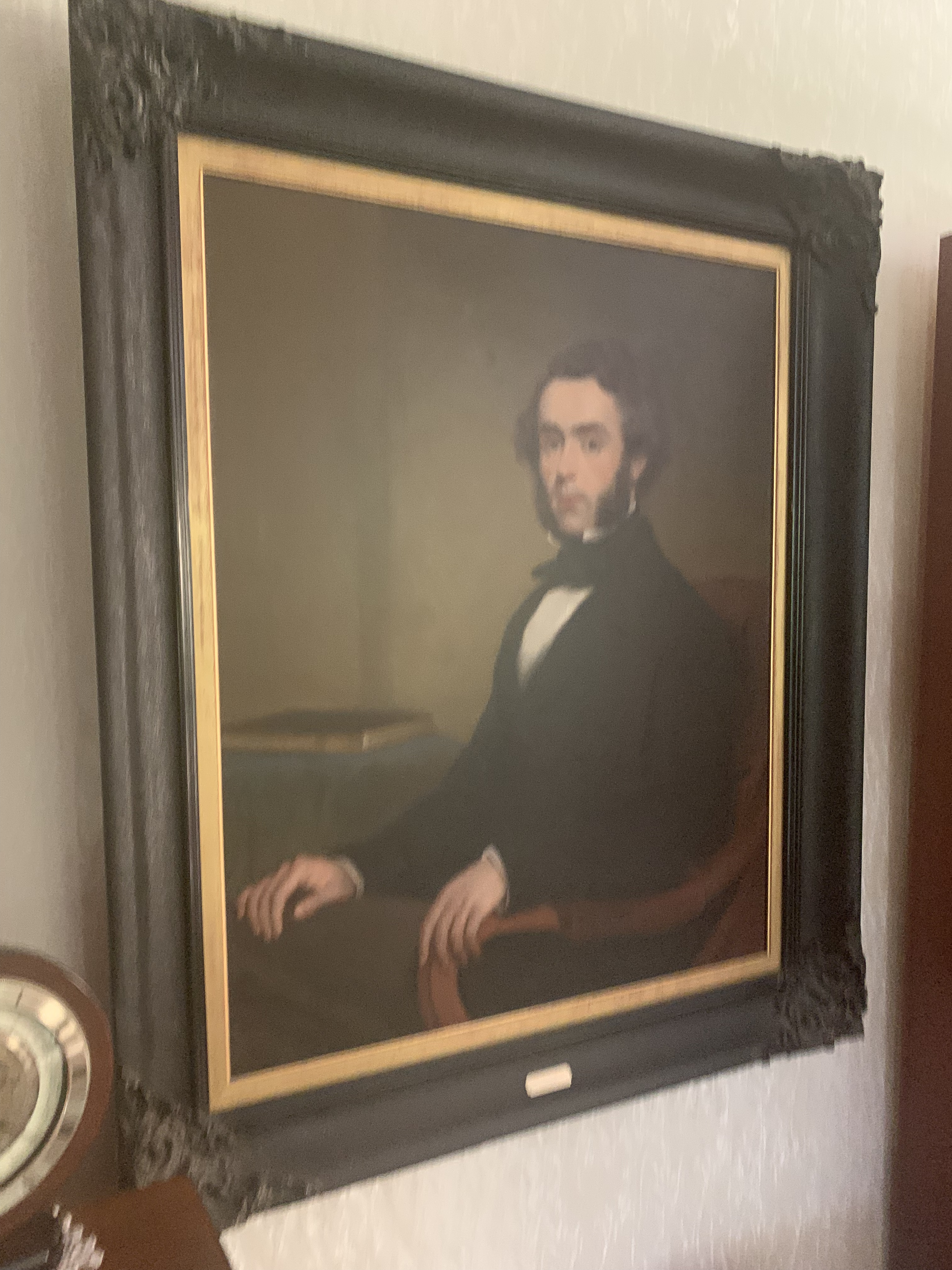
George Vause Birks c. 1850s

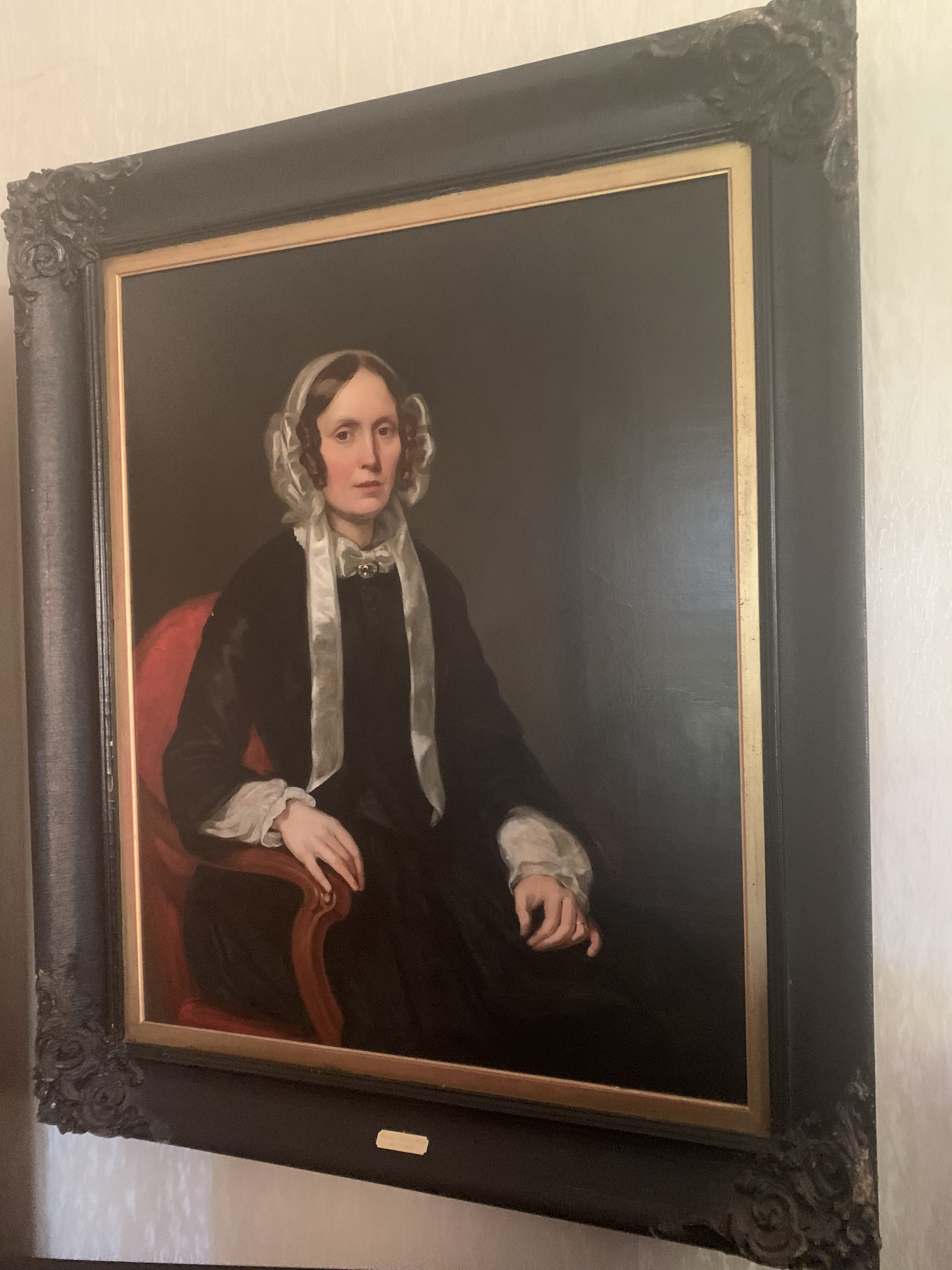
Hannah Napier Birks c. 1850s

Dr. George Vause Birks (7 December 1815 – 31 January 1858) and Hannah Napier Birks (6 May 1807 – 13 August 1883) arrived in South Australia in December 1853 with their seven children:

- George Napier Birks (24 October 1838 – 14 September 1895) married Helen Rosetta Thomas (30 August 1845 – 3 May 1932) on 28 January 1863. She was the second daughter of William Kyffin Thomas. He founded Birks Chemists with William H. Birks, joined William Lane's contingent to "New Australia" in Paraguay, where he died; his wife returned to Adelaide.

- Helen Mary Birks (14 December 1863 – 19 April 1944) married Albert Henry Chartier (c. 1863 – 25 January 1937) on 21 June 1888
- George Frederick "Fred" Birks (2 March 1866 – 6 May 1948) married Grace Emeline Preston ( – 20 June 1937) on 4 July 1889, moved to Paraguay in 1893, returned disillusioned to Australia and founded Potter & Birks, manufacturing chemists. He was a director of Berlei and other companies. He was the first Australian director, then vice-president of Rotary International. Lived at "Kadina", Killara.

- Eric Napier Birks (2 May 1890 – 11 June 1948) married to Muriel. After returning from Paraguay he was a businessman in New South Wales; activist for citrus growers, hon. organiser for Scouts in NSW and 1929 campaign director for William Morris Hughes. Both he and his father were recipients of the King's Jubilee Medal in 1935. In 1937 he was appointed deputy chairman of the War Pensions Entitlements Tribunal.
- Elma Margaret Preston Birks (6 July 1893 – ) married Anquetil Charles Somerville (1 June 1892 – ), lived in Epping, New South Wales. He was a son of architect Anquetil Fitz Townsend Somerville ( – 8 March 1931) of Pymble, New South Wales.

- Florence Napier Birks (5 February 1870 – 22 December 1940) married George Weidenhofer (1866–1960) on 7 June 1893

- Florence Margaret Weidenhofer (9 June 1901 – 15 April 1992) married Leslie Wilfred Randell (3 February 1893 – 18 October 1968) on 26 June 1930. He was a great-grandson of William Beavis Randell.
- Edith Helen Weidenhofer (21 April 1903 – 2 January 2012) married Doug McFarlane on 26 August 1930. Life member Meals on Wheels, Queensland.

- Charles Edgar Birks (8 October 1871 – 20 June 1944) married Florence Marion Goode (1870 – 14 May 1914) on 21 June 1899; Lina Amanda Berg (1874 – 19 October 1919) in 1916; Edith Fanny Edmunds (c. 1874 – 21 September 1937) on 6 February 1921. Florence was the second daughter of Henry Abel Goode (1838–1921); Lina was daughter of Carl Wilhelm Berg (c. 1847 – 30 November 1922) and Amelia née Beard; Edith née Blades was widow of Louis George Edmunds (1875–1911). Died at Murray Bridge.

- Henry Napier Birks (10 June 1905 – 1980) married Florence Marianne Barnes "Sister Barnes" (1903–1987) on 18 April 1933, lived at Wallaroo, then Kurralta Park

- Dr. Alfred James Birks (12 January 1874 – November 1916) medical practitioner and dentist, worked as dentist in Asunción, Paraguay 1893, spent four years in Philadelphia.
- (William) Kyffin Birks (5 July 1875 – 1938) married Bessie Jacobson ( – ) on 29 July 1898 in Paraguay, moved to Argentina, where he was Chief of Staff of the Buenos Aires and Pacific Railway

- daughter (10 May 1899 – ) born at Trinidad, Paraguay
- Charles George Napier Birks (7 August 1914 – ) dual nationality: Argentinian and British

- (Mary) Constance Napier "Connie" Birks (14 April 1877 – 6 November 1901) married Henry Young "Harry" Greenway (1862–1946) in New Australia on 10 September 1896
- Winifred Emily Napier "Win" Birks (19 July 1882 – 9 February 1905) lived with her mother, never married.

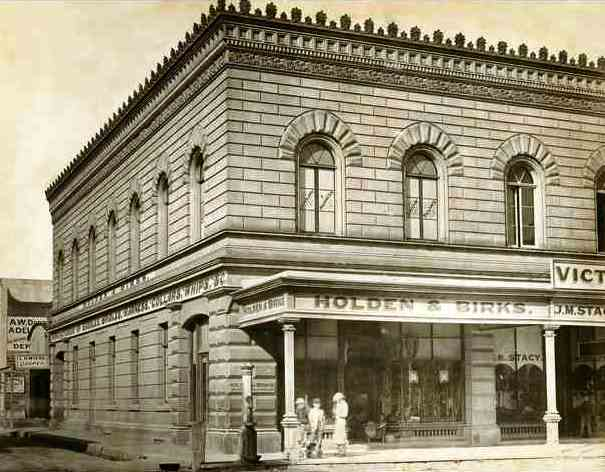
Holden & Birks in Rundle Street

- Alfred James Birks (7 June 1840 – 7 December 1873) married Catherine (Katherine?) Charlotte Salter ( – 2 March 1885) on 23 February 1865; she married again, to J(ames) Hardinge Thomas (c. 1851 – 12 May 1890) on 3 March 1884. Alfred was with the Bank of South Australia, then partner with James Alexander Holden in a retail saddlery and leathergoods business Holden & Birks 1871–1874, with premises at 59 Rundle Street at the southwest corner of Gawler Place; later to become Birks Chemists. Thomas was with British Australian Coke Company.

- Alfred Percy Birks (5 December 1865 – 30 September 1946) married Sarah Mary "Pollie" Hughes ( – 1958) on 28 August 1889, lived at "Wendouree", Clare

- A(Alfred) Clifford "Cliff" Birks (6 July 1890 – 2 December 1992) married Katharine Mary Yeatman (1893–1971) on 22 October 1919. Alfred was a councillor for Clare district 1939–1941, member of Arthur Bishop's Clare orchestra. Lived "Aberfeldy", Clare.
- Wilfred Kenneth Birks (5 July 1892 – 1962) married Emily Violet Donaldson (1898– ) in 1928
- Roland Napier Birks (17 August 1898 – 1988) married Olive Wakefield Virgo (1907–1975) in 1933
- Margaret Jeanne Birks (14 January 1903 – 27 April 1935)
- Isobel Birks (11 January 1906 – ) married John Henry Norman Bastian (1904–1974) c. 5 April 1930

- Frances Catherine Birks (6 May 1867 – 21 September 1887)
- Charlotte Napier "Lottie" Birks (14 February 1869 – 29 August 1890) died at home of uncle Charles Birks.
- William Salter "Will" Birks (7 August 1871 – 16 July 1940) married Rosalie Clyde Neill (1876 – 29 January 1940) on 8 March 1900. Rosalie was a sister of Kenneth William Neill (1880– ) below; they were grandchildren of William Kyffin Thomas.

- (Gwenda) Clyde Birks (10 February 1901 – ) lived in New South Wales, never married.
- Donald Neill Birks (1902 – 27 December 1928)

- Elizabeth Adelaide "Bessie" Birks (1873 – 20 December 1922) married Dr. Ambrose Spong (1876 – 8 December 1959) on 21 January 1907

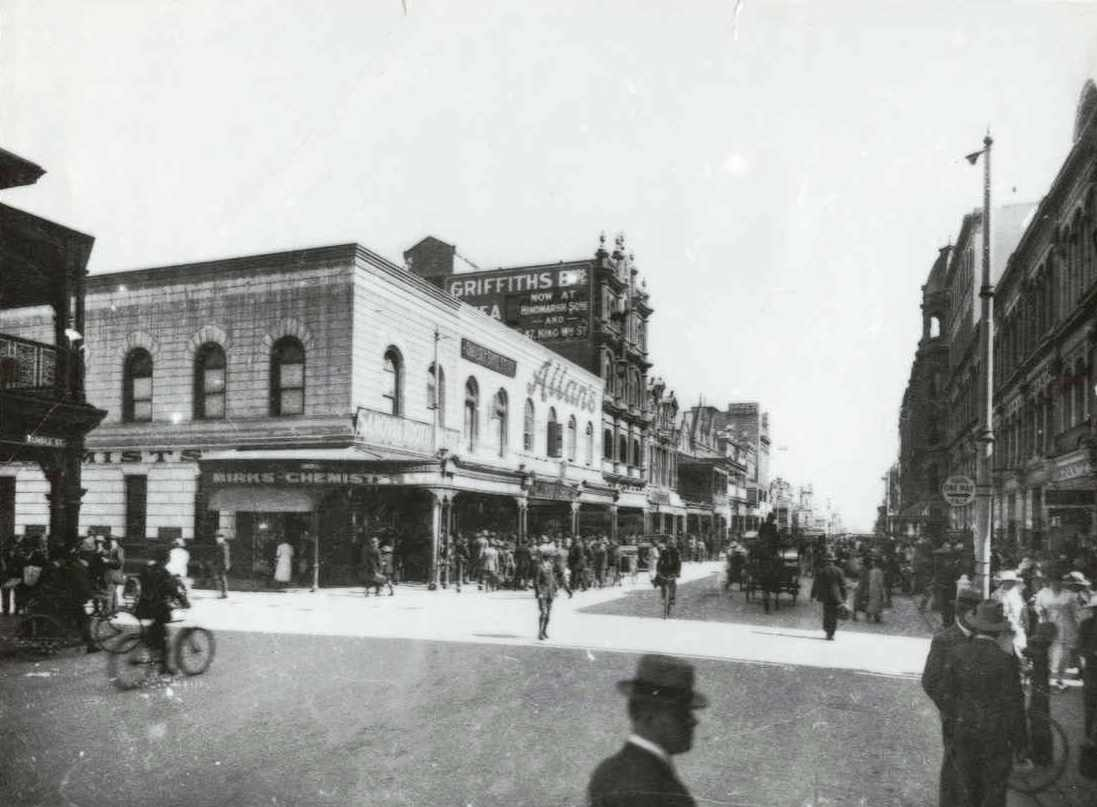
Birks' Chemists, Rundle Street, Adelaide, south west corner Gawler Place c. 1920

- William Hanson Birks (28 December 1841 – 5 August 1925) married Adeline Jefferson "Ada" Raymond (c. 1840 – 15 August 1918) of River Don, Tasmania on 28 August 1863. He and brother George Napier Birks opened Birks Chemists at the Rundle Street – Gawler Place corner in 1876. He had a residence in Beaumont, died in Sydney.

- Lalah Edith Birks (7 June 1866 – 22 November 1955) married Robert Joseph Hawkes (c. 1853 – 29 May 1901) on 10 November 1900. Hawkes was with E S & A Bank. She contracted smallpox on a visit to India in 1893, and survived, moved to Sydney.
- Herbert Vause Birks (1868 – 7 April 1923)
- Raymond Birks (1871–) married Sara Moyle Drew (7 February 1870 – ) on 23 September 1896, lived at the mansion "Craig-yr-Ogo" in Beaumont. He took over management of Birks Chemists after the partnership was dissolved, then it was sold to P. R. Magarey (1876–1935), son of S. J. Magarey. He was later Australian manager of the Canadian Export Company.

- Dorothy Raymond Birks (8 October 1897 – 1972)

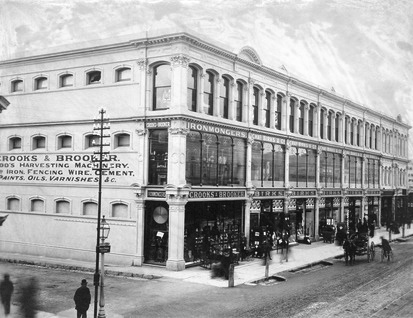
Charles Birks drapery store NE corner Rundle Street and Stephens Place c. 1900

- Charles Napier Birks (13 February 1844 – 29 April 1924), generally known as Charles Birks (without middle name), married Mary Maria Thomas (c. 1843 – 18 March 1878) on 13 September 1866; Rosetta Jane "Rose" Thomas (12 March 1856 – 3 October 1911) on 8 March 1879. Mary and Rose were first and fifth daughters of William Kyffin Thomas. He married once more, to Alice May Hone (1878– ), a sister of Dr F. S. Hone, on 11 September 1913, lived "Felton", Lefevre Terrace, North Adelaide, then from 1914 at "Avonlea", 26 Northcote Tce., Gilberton. She married again, to George E. Goodhart, on 20 December 1926. He was founder of Charles Birks & Co., the Rundle Street department store.

- Mary Frances Birks (26 September 1867 – 1 June 1916)
- Helen Napier "Nellie" Birks (20 June 1869 – 27 January 1949) married Charles Hedley Phillipps "Hedley" Fisher (c. 1860 – 25 November 1938), son of Daniel Fisher MP on 14 February 1898

- Margaret Beatrice Fisher (1898–1987) married John Neetlee "Jack" Bagot (17 December 1898 – 1977) on 11 June 1932. Jack was a grandson of Edward Meade Bagot.
- Sybil Helen Fisher (1903–1995) married Frederick Winsloe Hall (14 May 1899 – 1953) on 10 June 1933

- Edith Vause Birks (9 May 1871 – 1959) married Dr. Charles Henry Reissmann ( – ) on 31 July 1900; they changed their names to Riceman, lived at Mt. Lofty.

- Nora Frances Reissmann/Riceman (20 April 1902 – ) married Ronald Nicholas Lamond Hopkins ( –1990) in 1926. He was SA's highest military officer.
- Sidney Mary Reissmann (2 September 1905 – ) left for England to pursue her pianoforte and Dalcroze eurhythmics interests.
- Barbara Meredith Reissmann/Riceman (4 May 1907 – 1996) married Edward Lauriston Phillips (1892–1971) in 1936
- David Stirling Reissmann/Riceman (30 September 1910 – 2001) married Nancy Helen Magarey (1915–2005), a great-granddaughter of Thomas Magarey. He was a scientist with Waite Research, CSIR, pioneer of soil trace element research, president of Legacy (SA).

- Catherine Louise Birks (Katherine?) (14 April 1873 – 1930) married Norman McDougall ( – ) in Beddgelert, Wales, on 12 September 1900
- Margaret Eason Birks (6 February 1875 – 12 November 1950) married Walter Fowler-Brownsworth ( – ) on 23 August 1913
- Napier Kyffin Birks (21 January 1876 – 22 August 1953) married Lucy McDougall ( – 26 January 1951) on 11 September 1899, lived The Parade, Norwood, then 3 Springfield Ave., Springfield. He became partner in Charles Birks & Co in 1900. He was cited as one of four co-respondents in the divorce of Tessie and Harold Bickford (1876–1958) in 1922.

- Edith Napier Birks (9 June 1900 – 13 September 1975) was an artist, arts administrator and speedboat racer.
- Leslie Napier Birks (30 December 1904 – 14 July 1929) killed in light aircraft crash
- Norman Napier Birks (6 September 1906 – 17 February 1949) married Patricia Baines Bruce (1912– ) on 28 June 1932. He was managing director of Motors Ltd., Adelaide, and original 1925 member Cambridge University Air Squadron.

- John Napier Birks (30 August 1845 – 10 May 1929) married Sophia Roberts ( – 30 December 1886) on 30 March 1871; he married again, to Ann Susannah "Annie" Burrowes ( – 16 August 1946) on 28 January 1888. As Rev. Birks conducted marriages August 1871 to 1873 (last was of W. R. Birks to J. S. Crooks), subsequently his licence was revoked. They were pioneer settlers at Murtho irrigation settlement from 1895 to 1898 or 1899, when the venture failed at a substantial loss to all concerned. Lived Claremont, Western Australia from around 1900, perhaps earlier; he had pharmacy at 130 William Street Perth; youngest son Arthur Norman Birks had pharmacy at 680 Hay Street, Perth.

- Elsie Ellen Birks (10 January 1872 – 18 November 1950) married John Erskine Miller Gilmour ( – ) on 22 September 1897. She was the schoolteacher at Murtho irrigation settlement from 1895 to 1898.

- John Reginald Gilmour (1898– )

- John Francis "Frank" Birks (1873 – 19 April 1953) married Edith Annie Barker ( –1970) on 23 March 1907, maybe lived "Naranga", Walkerville Road, Medindie; lived Glen Osmond in 1941, 18 Montrose Avenue, Netherby in 1953.

- Norman Frank Birks (3 February 1908 – 1994) married Ethel Mary Oates ( –1979) on 25 November 1933
- (Sophie) Margaret Birks (1910–) married Reginald Alan McArthur (1896–) on 25 October 1941
- Jessie Mabel Birks (1913–2009) married Christopher John McLennan (1904–1980) in 1935
- Robert James Birks (1917–1999) married Lucille Elaine Brooks ( –1994) on 9 May 1942

- George Vause Birks (1875–1959) married Olive Lenore Radford (1879–1963) in 1905
- E(dward) Harold Birks (15 September 1881 – 1959) married Margaret Stevenson ( – 1971), lived at Renmark, then 68 Lockwood Road, Burnside

- John Edward "Jack" Birks (1920–) married Doreen Phyllis Wood ( – ) on 24 January 1945; married at Whyalla
- Frank Reginald Birks (1922 – ) engaged to Laurel May Kelly (1923– ) in 1944
- Ronald George Birks (1924–1992) married Alice Jessie "Peggy" Aird ( – ) on 21 July 1945
- Arthur William Birks (1927–) married Valma "Val" Spehr ( – ) of Mount Gambier on 19 January 1952

- Arthur Norman Birks (28 December 1885 – ) married Gladys Helen Creagh ( – ) on 25 May 1921. He had pharmacy at 680 Hay Street, Perth.
- Phillis Birks (27 December 1889 – ) married Frank Cave Glyde (c. 1885 – 17 February 1947) on 3 April 1913. They lived in Claremont, Western Australia. He was a son of Samuel Dening Glyde.
- Annie Eileen Birks (24 October 1894 – ) married James Hall Wylie ( – 31 October 1944) on 21 February 1920, farmed at Narembeen, Western Australia

- Walter Richard Birks (27 July 1847 – 4 May 1900) married Jemima "Mina" Scott Crooks (c. 1844 – 10 July 1926) on 29 April 1873. He was a partner in Charles Birks & Co from 1879 to 1886 and participated in the Murtho irrigation settlement from 1894 to 1898 or 1899, losing their considerable investment.

- Lawrence Birks (19 May 1874 – 25 July 1924) married Edith Mabel Luke (10 April 1880 – 21 July 1923) on 29 April 1909. Student at Prince Alfred College, appointed assistant professor of Engineering, Heriot-Watt College in 1896. He was chief electrical engineer in Wellington, New Zealand, and pioneer of hydro-electricity in NZ. Edith was the elder daughter of Sir Charles Manley Luke of Wellington. Their children included:

- Margaret Ann Birks (24 March 1910 – 1989) married Alexander Charles Begg
- Walter Richard Birks (17 October 1911 – 3 February 1974)
- Charles Napier Birks (20 April 1914 – 26 March 1988)

- Dr. Melville Birks (30 January 1876 – 27 April 1924) married Janet Catherine MacIntyre ( – ) on 5 March 1909. He was surgeon, superintendent and researcher at Petersburg (Peterborough SA), also its mayor, then superintendent Broken Hill Hospital.

- Peter Macintyre Birks FRCS (16 January 1910 – ) married Betty Powell ( – )
- Walter Gordon Birks (11 November 1911 – 9 January 1997)
- Joan Birks (26 July 1915 – ) married Eric William Gray ( – ) on 5 March 1943, lived Oxford, England

- Katherine Emily Birks (17 May 1881 – 1934) married Wilfrid Fewkes Partridge (1880– ) on 3 January 1925. W. F. Partridge was later a newspaperman in Stanley, Tasmania.
- Charlotte Napier Birks (14 February 1884 – 1934) was superintendent of the Children's Library and secretary of the League of Nations Union in South Australia.
- Walter Richard Birks (11 March 1886 – 1960) married Bessie Threadgill (c. 1895 – 18 August 1954) in 1931. He graduated from Roseworthy College 1910, returned as principal 1927, resigned 1932 after considerable student dissatisfaction, related in part to manipulation of students' marks.

- Jennet Frances Birks ( – )

- Dora Hannah Birks (16 December 1887 – September 1987) married Robert Everett Woods ( – 27 October 1972) on 27 April 1922. She served as a nursing Sister in France during World War I, they settled in Victor Harbor.

- Emily Hannah Birks (1848 – 23 February 1932) married Alexander Crooks (c. 1848 – 29 August 1943) on 18 September 1873. Crooks, a brother of Jemima "Mina" Scott Birks, was a noted cricketer, superintendent of the Kent Town Methodist Sunday school, and manager of the Commercial Bank of South Australia, which failed in February 1886. Birks, accountant Alexander McKenzie Wilson and clerk Caulfield Barton were convicted of embezzlement; Birks was sentenced to eight years' jail. He moved to Claremont, Western Australia.

- Hilda Napier Crooks (9 October 1875 – 1973) married Kenneth William Neill (1880–1972) of Alberton, South Australia on 27 March 1907. He was brother of Rosalie Clyde Neill (1876–1940) above; they were grandchildren of William Kyffin Thomas.

Other notable Australians named Birks

- Rev. Martin James Birks (28 October 1840 – 20 February 1915), son of William Birks of Longton, Staffordshire, married Mary Moss ( – ). He was pastor of Maughan Methodist New Connexion Church 1875–1883 following the death of Rev. James Maughan, and appears not to be closely related.
- Frederick Birks, VC, MM (1894–1917) soldier, born in Buckley, Flintshire, killed in World War I, appears not to be closely related.
