= Kyffin =

Kyffin is a name, which is used as a given name, surname or part of a double-barrelled surname. It may refer to:

== Surname ==
=== Single ===
- Morris Kyffin (c.1555–1598), Welsh author and soldier

=== Double ===
- Austin Kyffin-Taylor (1858–1955), British Conservative Party politician
- Gerald Kyffin-Taylor (1863–1949), British soldier and politician
- William Francis Kyffin Taylor, 1st Baron Maenan (1854–1951), English barrister and judge
- Evan Kyffin Thomas (1866–1935), newspaper proprietor of the South Australian Register, son of William
- Robert Kyffin Thomas (1851–1910), newspaper proprietor of the South Australian Register, son of William
- William Kyffin Thomas (1821–1878), editor newspaper proprietor of the South Australian Register,

== Given name ==
- Kyffin Williams (1918–2006), Welsh landscape painter
- Kyffin Simpson (2004–), Caymanian Indycar racing driver

== See also ==
- Mount Kyffin, Antarctica, named after Evan Kyffin Thomas
