= Lawrence Birks =

Australian-born electrical engineer

Lawrence Birks (19 May 1874 – 25 July 1924) was an Australian-born electrical engineer noted for his pioneering work on hydro-electric power generation in New Zealand.

== History ==
Lawrence was born in Norwood, a suburb of Adelaide, South Australia, the eldest son of Walter Richard Birks (1847–1900) and his wife Jemima "Mina" Scott Birks, née Crooks (1844–1926). Lawrence's father was one of a Wesleyan Methodist family of eight who emigrated to South Australia from England in 1853 and were prominent in Adelaide's business community, notably in connection with Charles Birks & Co.'s retail store and Birks Chemists, both in Rundle Street. The distinguished occupational health specialist Melville Birks was a brother. Their father is chiefly remembered as a founder of the failed communist settlement at Murtho (1894–1899) on the River Murray.

Lawrence was educated at Prince Alfred College, and the University of Adelaide, where he was a brilliant student, winning the Angas Engineering Exhibition in 1892 and sharing the Angas Scholarship for Engineering with Alfred Chapple the following year. He went to England around 1895 and studied at University College London winning a Gilchrist Scholarship in 1896. He studied under Professor Beare (another PAC alumnus), and Professor S. P. Thompson, then gained valuable experience at Callenders Cables & Construction works in Erith, Kent. He continued his studies on the Continent, where he was impressed by Swiss electrical engineering practices, then returned to Adelaide on the Star of Australia in June 1900, only to find that his father had recently died.

There was practically no electrical work available in Adelaide at that time, so in November 1900 he took up a position as Assistant Engineer of State Tramways with the New South Wales Government, which was embarking on an ambitious tramway scheme on Sydney, then in 1903 proceeded to New Zealand as electrical engineer for the city of Christchurch. He was successively engineer to the Christchurch Tramway Construction Company, lecturer in electrical engineering at Canterbury College, engineer in charge of the Rotorua district, and in 1910 was appointed assistant electrical engineer to the New Zealand Government, under Evan Parry B.Sc. (1865–1938). He was responsible for the installation of the Lake Coleridge hydro-electric power plant of 8,000 horsepower (around 6 MW) capacity, the first hydro-electric installation in the Dominion, and for the system's commercial development. Mr. Parry returned to England in 1918, and Birks was appointed chief electrical engineer, responsible for the construction of hydro-electric works, which in the North Island alone amounted to £10,300,000 for plant of a total capacity of 165,000 h.p., and about 2,000 miles (3,200 km) of new 110,000 volt transmission lines. A similar system was planned for the South Island.

He was to have represented New Zealand as their delegate to the inaugural World Power Conference in London in May 1924, but was forced by pneumonia to return, shortly after catching up with friends and relations (and fellow Rotarians) in Adelaide. The paper he was to have delivered in London on the provision and reticulation of electrical energy was presented by his old senior colleague Evan Parry. He died a few months later.

== Family ==
On 29 April 1909 Lawrence Birks married Edith Mabel Luke (10 April 1880 – 21 July 1923), elder daughter of Sir Charles Manley Luke of Wellington. Their children included:

- Margaret Annie Birks (24 March 1910 – 29 May 1989) married Alexander Charles Begg
- Walter Richard Birks (17 October 1911 – 3 February 1974)
- Charles Napier Birks (20 April 1914 – 26 March 1988)
- Helen Grace Birks (born 26 June 1916)

== Sources ==
- Te Ara - The encyclopedia of New Zealand: Lawrence Birks
