= Walter Richard Birks =

South Australian agricultural scientist

Walter Richard Birks (11 March 1886 – 17 January 1960), often W. Richard Birks, a member of South Australia's prominent Birks family, was an agricultural scientist, remembered as principal of Roseworthy College from 1927 to 1932. His resignation followed an extensive inquiry into students' complaints, which culminated in their strike action.

== History ==
Birks was born in Hectorville, South Australia, to Walter Richard Birks and Jemima Scott Birks (married 1873). He was educated at Prince Alfred College and after matriculating spent three years working in the wholesale business of G. & R. Wills. He entered Adelaide University in 1905 and completed the requirements to enter a Bachelor of Science course. He went to Roseworthy Agricultural College in 1907 where was dux of the diploma course in 1908, then worked at Roseworthy as a demonstrator in the science laboratory, and studied the use of superphosphate in the germination of small seeds, completing his Bachelor of Science (Agriculture) degree in 1910.

He found employment with the New South Wales government South Wales Department of Agriculture.

He enlisted in the 1st AIF in July 1915 and was wounded in action in France in 1917, promoted several times in the field, with 4th Field Artillery Brigade in 1916, transferred as instructor to England in 1918; while on leave in 1919 studied plant breeding at Cambridge University; was promoted to the rank of Captain, which he relinquished in 1920 and proceeded to America for further experience in plant breeding. On his return to Australia he resumed work with the New South Wales government South Wales Department of Agriculture, and in February 1922 was appointed principal of the Dookie Agricultural College in Victoria.

He was a member of the Roseworthy Old Scholars' Association, and present at their 1926 reunion, A. C. Pritchard presiding due to the principal, W. J. Colebatch being interstate. In May 1927 he was appointed Principal of Roseworthy Agricultural College, succeeding Colebatch, who had been seconded to the Irrigation Commission. He arrived in Adelaide early in July 1927 and took up his duties shortly afterward. He announced the early implementation of annual farmers' schools, which were a feature of Victorian agricultural colleges, and very popular: attracting as many as 150 adult students, and bringing in additional instructors.

He married Bessie Threadgill (c. 1871 – 18 August 1954) in 1931. They had one daughter, Jennet Frances Birks.

== Student strike ==
On 4 January 1932 the students of Roseworthy Agricultural College went "on strike", citing "intolerable treatment" by the headmaster, W. R. Birks, their general claim being that college discipline is too severe for young men aged 16 to 20.

An inquiry, held at the Industrial Court from 2 February to 1 March 1932, was held into the Roseworthy strike, with 42 witnesses being called. Counsel for the students included as contributory causes:

- Expulsions: In 1930 four students were expelled by the Minister (Cowan) for "ragging" younger students, presumably the "initiations" mentioned elsewhere, but they held Birks responsible.
- Marking: The marks master, Alfred John Adams, gave one student, R. B. Postle, 112 marks for Agriculture, which Birks reassessed as 146, giving the student a first-class diploma rather than second-class. This was seen by some as exhibiting favoritism for Postle, although it is certain that Adams, who had a deep-seated antipathy for Birks, did not double-check marks received verbally.
- Initiations: In 1930 Birks banned such ceremonies, prompting one student to assert that they would continue without official sanction. When that occurred, Birks vowed to make life difficult for the five he believed responsible. He wrote to the parents of one student a letter which Kelly, presiding officer of the enquiry, considered improper. The initiations included some degree of flogging.
- Intolerance of loafers: Birks castigated a group of students who he felt were deliberately falling behind in their studies in order to quit the course.
- Accusations of loutish behavior: At a social dance evening Birks expelled a couple (Crisp and his female companion) who approached the supper table before the invited guests. Birks showed favoritism towards one Alfred Benzie, who was ostracised by other students for his gentlemanly conduct. He gave a stern lecture to the students over a series of New Years' pranks, which included throwing stones on the Guide hall roof, upsetting the lavatory bucket, and smearing treacle on the stairway banisters.

It would appear Birks was trying to assert the type of discipline he remembered from his prep school days, quite different from that of previous managements.

== See also ==
- John D. Custance, founder of Roseworthy College, sacked 1887
- William Lowrie, headmaster of Roseworthy College 1887–1894, sacked
