= William Lowery (disambiguation) =

William Lowery (1885–1941) was an American silent film actor.

Bill Lowery may also refer to:

- Bill Lowery (politician) (born 1947), U.S. Republican politician from California
- Bill Lowery (record producer) (1924–2004), American music entrepreneur

== See also ==
- William Lowrie (1857–1933), Australian agricultural educationist
- William Lowry (1884–1949), Northern Irish barrister, judge, Member of Parliament, and Attorney General for Northern Ireland
