= Robert Kyffin Thomas =

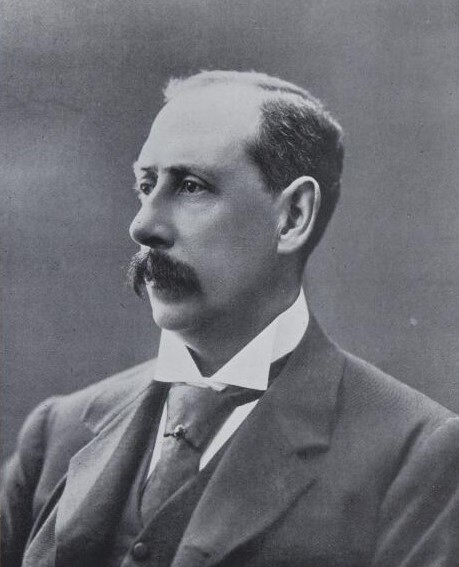

Sir Robert Kyffin Thomas (19 August 1851 – 13 June 1910) was a South Australian newspaper proprietor.

Sir Robert was born at Nailsworth, South Australia, the son of William Kyffin Thomas, proprietor of the South Australian Register.

Thomas's grandfather Robert Thomas printed South Australian Gazette and Colonial Register in London in 1829, and The South Australian Register, the first South Australian newspaper, in 1839. He also printed the first Government Gazette, but lost that business when he ran foul of Governor Gawler.

Thomas was educated at Mr. J. L. Young's' Adelaide Educational Institution, a contemporary of the Right Hon. C. C. Kingston. He took up journalism at the age of 18 and was soon chief reporter. He was admitted as a partner in the firm in 1877, and at the time of his death he was the senior proprietor of The Register.

Thomas was a prominent member of the South Australian branch of the Royal Geographical Society, the Adelaide Chamber of Commerce and the Adelaide Glee Club and served a term as president of each. He was treasurer of the Old Colonists' Association, an active Freemason and a Justice of the Peace for 22 years.

While in Great Britain in 1902 Thomas helped form the committee which commissioned Captain Adrian Jones to create the South African War Memorial, to be seen on the corner of King William Road and North Terrace, Adelaide, in front of Government House. On the same trip he acquired a number of paintings for the National Gallery of South Australia.

He was knighted in January 1909, one of the last to be conferred by King Edward VII. Thomas died on 13 June 1910 in Ardington, North Adelaide, South Australia.

== Family ==
In 1876 Thomas married Amelia Bowen (c. 1855 – 15 July 1922), daughter of Robert George Bowen, of Adelaide, on 6 January 1876. Their home for many years was "Ardington", Brougham Place, North Adelaide. Among their children were:

- Reginald Kyffin Thomas (7 November 1881 – 16 December 1914)
- Geoffry Kyffin Thomas (2 July 1883 – 1953) married Harriott Maria Birrell Haynes (1884 – 29 February 1952) on 5 September 1908. Harriott was the fourth daughter of Rev. J. C. Haynes
- Owen Kyffin Thomas (1898–1963) married Jean Thornton Creswell (29 July 1897 – 1970) on 25 February 1922. She was the youngest daughter of John Creswell.
- Millicent Kyffin Thomas (1876 – ) married David Thomas Harbison MD ChM (c. 1871 – 12 July 1953) in 1922. David was SA tennis champion, moved to Bowral, New South Wales. Their only son was killed in Italy during WWII.
- Hilda Kyffin Thomas (2 April 1878 – 1947) married Leonard Hack (1876–1912) on 28 July 1906. Leonard was a grandson of John Barton Hack.
- Nora Kyffin Thomas (5 June 1880 – 13 January 1951) Nora was a noted violinist, studied under Hermann Heinicke, joined Carmelite Convent, Exmouth, England as Sister Teresa.
- Kathleen Kyffin Thomas (7 February 1891 – 1973) Kathleen was Divisional Commandant of Red Cross, never married.

Sir Robert had one surviving brother, Evan Kyffin Thomas (1866 – 27 July 1935), and six sisters: Mrs George Birks, Mrs. William Neill, Mrs Charles Birks, Mrs. J. Edwin Thomas, Mrs. G. B. Mallam and Miss Margaret Thomas.

Amelia Thomas, née Bowen, was an aunt of Esther Gwendolyn "Stella" Bowen (1893–1947), renowned artist and writer.
