= Bill Lowrey =

Bill Lowrey may refer to:

- Bill G. Lowrey (1862–1947), U.S. Representative

== See also ==
- William Lowry (1884–1949), Irish MP
- William Lowrie (1857–1933), Australian agricultural educator
