= Arthur James Perkins =

Arthur James Perkins (11 May 1871 – 23 June 1944) was a viticulturist, important in the early history of South Australia's wine industry. He was headmaster of Roseworthy Agricultural College for ten years, and credited with developing many leaders in primary production.

== History ==
Perkins was born in Ramleh, Egypt, (Note: Ramleh was a seaside resort town to the east of Alexandria, not to be confused with Ramleh in Palestine.) a son of Anna Edith Perkins, née Barker, and William Edmund Perkins (1848–1915), a Reuters agent. He was educated at St Louis College, Carthage, St Charles College, Tunis, All Saints' School, Bloxham, England, and the École Nationale d'Agriculture at Montpellier, France, with a special interest in viticulture. By this time his father was managing a French energy company in Tunisia, and Perkins found employment managing several properties in that country.

He was in Tunis when, on the strong recommendation of Mons. G. de Foix, Director of the School of Agriculture, Montpellier, he was offered the position of chief viticulturist to the South Australian government. He was appointed Professor of Viticulture in South Australia in 1892, over the protests of those who wanted someone with local knowledge.

"Our soils and climates could produce wine equal to any, and what we wanted chiefly at present was some one to advise our vignerons in winemaking. We wanted to build up a large export trade, by which alone we could hope to extend the industry to the fullest possible extent, and the export of inferior quality wine might do more to cripple our viticultural industry than anything else. It would be very inadvisable to confine the selection of an expert to residents of South Australia or any of the other colonies." (Richard Butler)

The government expected that the professor would establish an experimental vineyard and orchard in conjunction with Roseworthy College, and instruct the students. He would visit South Australia's vineyards and orchards and give advice and instruction to farmers on viticulture and fruitgrowing. He would be attached to the college, with quarters there, and draw a salary of £850 per annum. He would be responsible to Professor William Lowrie, but have a free hand as to his own movements and program. Perkins, then 21 years of age, arrived in Adelaide aboard the SS Arcadia on 17 July 1892. In 1894 he was appointed inspector under the Vine, Fruit, and Vegetable Protection Act.

In 1898 graduated students taking further studies in Europe, reported that Roseworthy's facilities and training were every bit as good as those in London, and Montpellier.

In 1899 he was, with Maurice William Holtze (shortly to be replaced by George Quin), one of two government appointees to the original Phylloxera Board, whose other members were Thomas Hardy, George Fullerton Cleland, Henry Maydwell Martin, William Patrick Auld, Hermann Büring, and Benno Seppelt.

He was appointed Principal of Roseworthy College in 1904 and in 1914 promoted to Director of Agriculture, succeeding Professor Lowrie.

He retired in 1936, and was awarded an OBE in 1937.

== Personal ==
Perkins married Mary Ethel Haslam at Geelong, Victoria on 7 March 1900 and had a home at 44 Marlborough Street, Brighton, South Australia. Their son, Dr Horace James Perkins (1901–1986), was a talented musician and composer.

An archetypal "absent-minded professor", Perkins was fluent in Arabic, French and Italian, and a scholar of Latin and classical Greek. In quiet moments at Roseworthy he was known to amuse himself by producing original translations of Greek classics. He wrote an extensive history of the first decade (1836–1846) of South Australian Pastoral and Agricultural industries. A supporter of John Ridley, he wrote a detailed refutation of (W.A. Director of Agriculture) George L. Sutton's espousal (Note: G. L. Sutton, "The Invention of the Stripper", Journal of the Department of Agriculture of Western Australia, vol 14, no 3, September 1937, pp 94–247) of John Wrathall Bull's claims to invention of the stripper.

He died at a private hospital in Glenelg, and his remains privately interred in St Jude's cemetery, Brighton.
