= Evan Parry =

Welsh electrical engineer

Evan Parry (30 November 1865 – 17 December 1938) was a Welsh electrical engineer noted for his pioneering work in New Zealand.

== History ==
He was born in Llanddeiniolen, Carnarvonshire, Wales, the son of William Parry, a slate quarry manager, and his wife Eliza, née Williams. He was educated at Bangor and studied for his BSc at Glasgow University. He secured an engineering position at the Deptford power station and subsequently for the British Thomson-Houston company. In 1897 he began work for the American-born Horace Field Parshall, an engineer with a lucrative business electrifying tramways in Dublin, Glasgow, Bristol and elsewhere.

In 1911 he was appointed the first electrical engineer for New Zealand's Public Works Department and was immediately involved in the construction and installation of the Lake Coleridge hydroelectric power station, which was opened in 1914.

He left for other employment in England in 1919; his successor was Australian-born engineer Lawrence Birks (1874–1924), who fell ill in Adelaide on his way to London, where he was to have represented New Zealand at the inaugural World Power Conference in 1924, and returned to Wellington, where he died a few months later. The paper which he was to have read to the conference was instead delivered by his old colleague and mentor Evan Parry.

== Sources ==
- Te Ara - The encyclopedia of New Zealand: Evan Parry
