= Sedna (drink) =

Alcoholic beverage from Belfast, Northern Ireland

Sedna was an alcoholic beverage made in Belfast, Ireland, and sold as a "tonic". In its earlier days it was made from port wine with the addition of extracts of coca leaf, kola nut and beef. From around 1923 its only advertised additive was the kola extract. The brand name was later used in Australia for a similar product, locally produced.

== History ==
Sedna was first manufactured by Snaed Manufacturing Company (later Deans, Logan & Co. Ltd.), of 16 Commercial Court, Belfast, and went on sale in 1897. In 1898 the company had secured 10 outlets, which had grown to 100 in 1899.

It has been suggested the brand name was chosen as "Andes" (source of the coca extract) spelled backwards, but it may be significant that both "Sedna" and "Snaed" are anagrams of "Deans". Alex Deans was a principal of the company, and uncle of George Deans (1875–1938), head of Charles Moore and Co.'s Perth, Western Australia, emporium.

The company was in the hands of a liquidator in 1932.

=== Australia ===
Sedna was from 1908 imported into Australia and marketed by the Seppelts wine company. The trade ran both ways – Deans and Logan marketed Australian wines in Britain.

In New Zealand it was classed as a "tonic" and only sold in chemist's shops, while in Australia it was classed as an alcoholic beverage and legally sold only in licensed premises. In 1920 two Rundle Street, Adelaide businesses were fined for selling the product: Foy & Gibson (a major department store), and Birks Chemists. Chemists in country areas were convicted of sale of Sedna and Maltox (a similar product made by Bickford's), evidence being produced by police "sting operations".

Outrageous behaviour by persons who became inebriated on the tonic has been ascribed to the cocaine and caffeine content of Sedna. After 1923 advertisements no longer mentioned coca and beef in advertisements for the product, kola remaining an essential ingredient.

At some stage Sedna sold in Australia was locally produced by the Seppeltsfield company, and it is likely but by no means certain that Seppelts purchased rights to the brand name from Deans & Logan's liquidators c. 1932. Later bottles are clearly marked "PRODUCE OF AUSTRALIA", and the product has been identified by wine writer Philip White as based on Grenache port from the Para vineyard. It was sold in 750ml bottles and had an alcoholic content 33% proof. It has been reported as containing 15 grains per fluid ounce (around 30g/litre) of kola nut powder, perhaps 60 mg/100 ml of caffeine. (Red Bull contains 32 mg/100 ml).

Marketing of Sedna in Australia ceased some time after 1950. It has no connection to the wine made in the Napa Valley AVA or the vodka made in Newfoundland.

== Gallery ==
Lithographed postcards from Deans & Logan, Belfast c. 1900 advertising their "tonic" Sedna

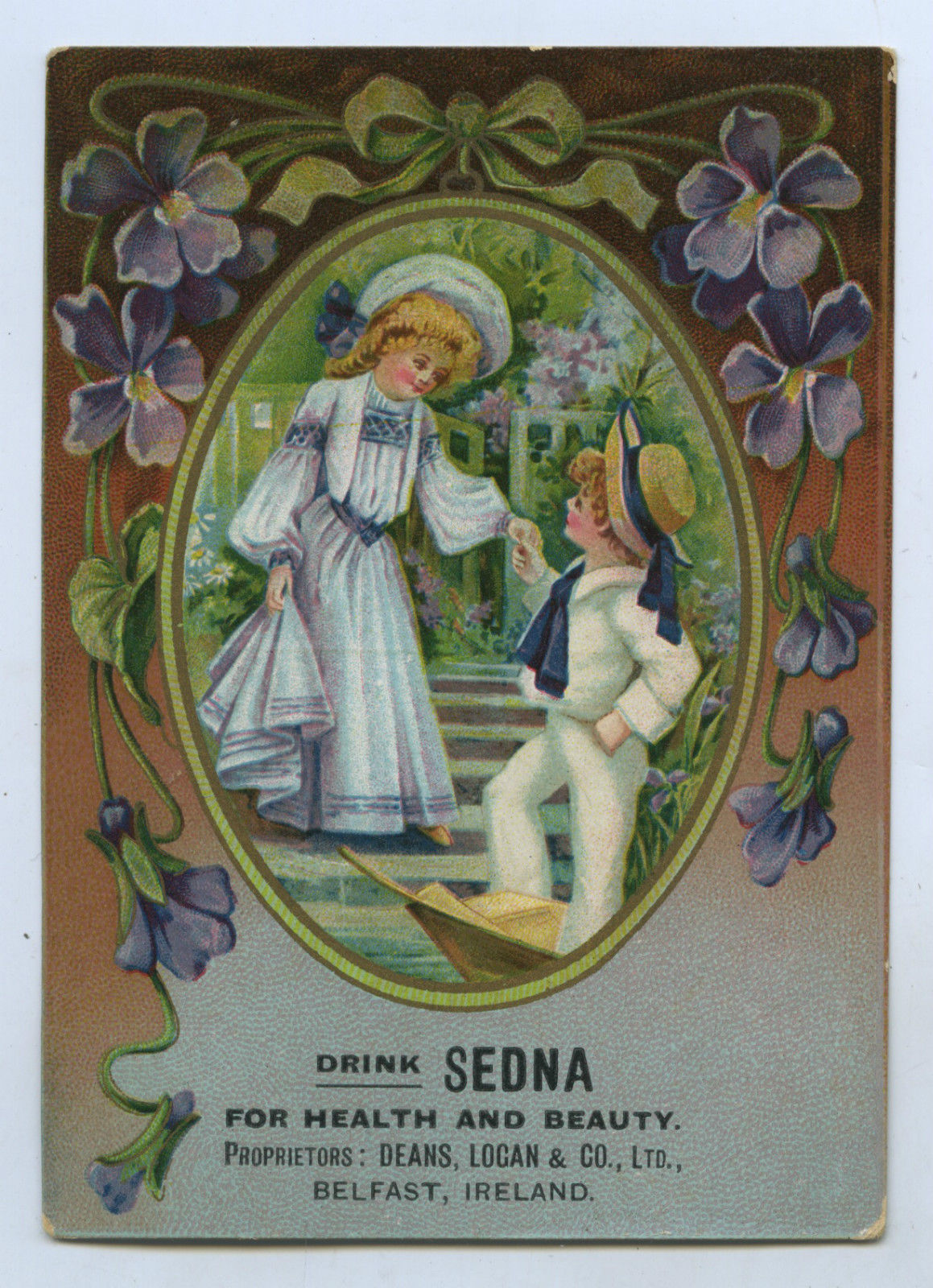

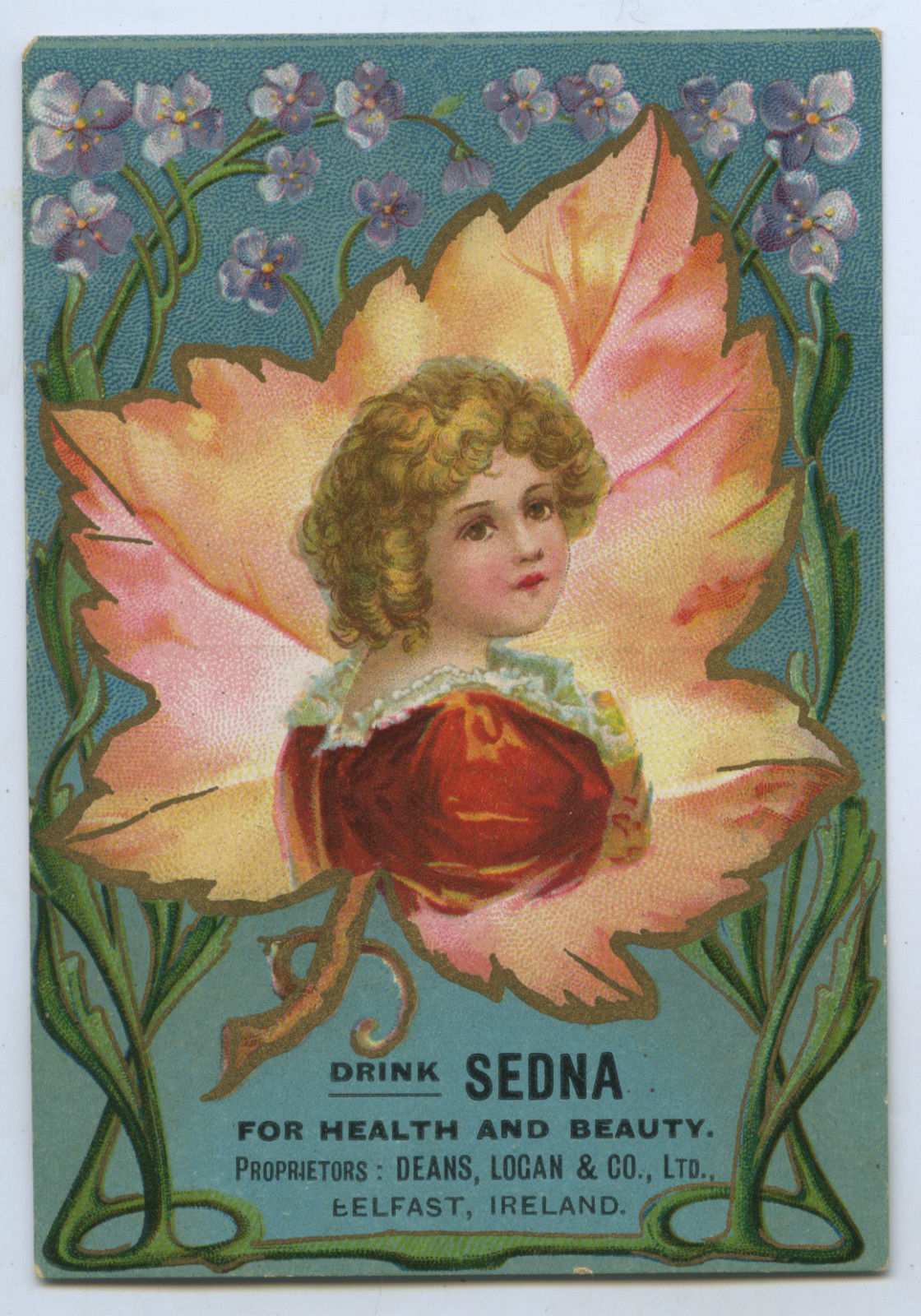

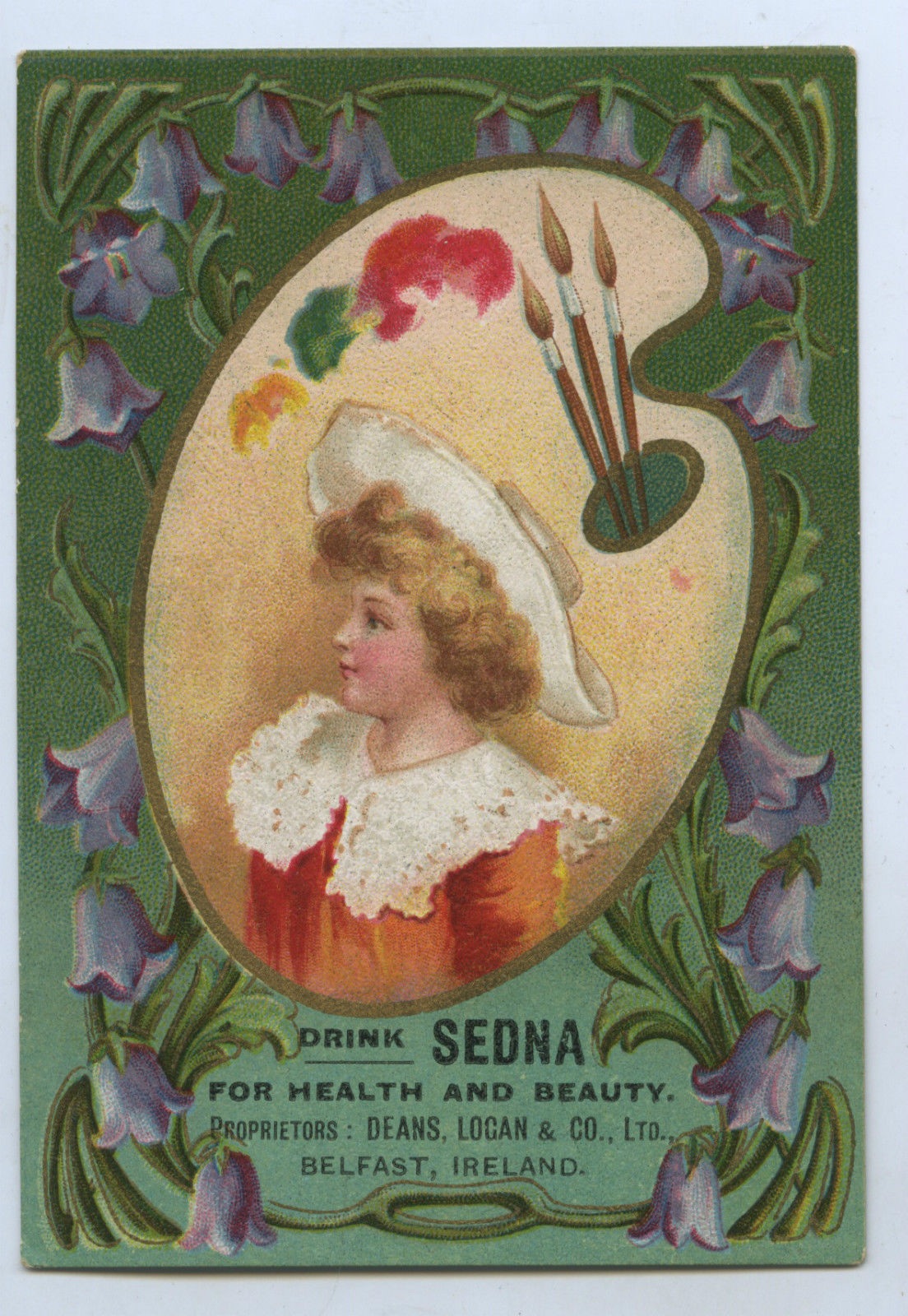

== See also ==
- Australian wine
