= St Jude's Church, Brighton =

Church in Holdfast Bay City, South Australia

Coordinates: 35°01′01″S 138°31′24″E

Religion
- Affiliation: Christianity

Location
- Location: Brighton, South Australia
- Interactive map of St Jude's Church, Brighton

Architecture
- Groundbreaking: 1854

St Jude's Church, Brighton is an Anglican church on Brighton Road, Brighton, South Australia.

== History ==
The land for the church was purchased from John Alexander Voules Brown. The foundation stone was laid on 16 December 1854 by Lady Fox Young with Archbishop Augustus Short conducting the service.

For the first ten years of its existence, St Jude's was served by the incumbent of St Mary's on the Sturt, who also had responsibility for Christ Church, O'Halloran Hill.

On 24 December 1948 the St Jude's Players had their beginning.

The church was seriously damaged in the 1954 Adelaide earthquake.

== People ==
- Henry Dutton, pastoralist
- Garry Weatherill
- Hartley Williams, curate 1879–1881

== St Jude's Cemetery ==
Though Church of England property, the churchyard adjacent St Jude's church was properly known as Brighton Cemetery until 1930. The large public graveyard on the other side of Brighton Road and further north is the North Brighton Cemetery.

The Australian Dictionary of Biography lists as the following people interred in the cemetery:

- James Ashton (1859–1935), artist
- Sir Reginald Roderic St Clair Chamberlain (1901–1990) judge
- Harold More Cooper (1886–1970) wireless operator, archaeologist and historian
- Sidney Crawford (1885–1968) businessman and philanthropist
- Sir William Rooke Creswell (1852–1933), vice admiral
- Ida Lucy Croft (1878–1957) pharmacist
- Alexander Crooks (1847–1943) bank manager, cricketer and embezzler
- Josiah Eustace Dodd (1856–1952) organbuilder
- Sir Herbert Sydney Hudd (1881–1948) politician
- Sir Douglas Mawson (1882–1958), geologist, Antarctic explorer, and academic
- Sir John Newland (1864–1932) railwayman and politician
- K. Langloh Parker aka Catherine Eliza (Katie) Stow (1856–1940), collector of Aboriginal legends
- Arthur James Perkins (1871–1944) agricultural scientist and viticulturist
- Sir William Herbert Phillipps (1847–1935) merchant and philanthropist
- Rowland Rees (1840–1904) architect and politician
- Herbert Clarence Richards (1876–1949) businessman and motor-body manufacturer
- Tobias John Martin Richards (1850–1939) manufacturer
- Geoffrey Richard Shedley (1914–1981), architect and sculptor
- Richard Smith (1836–1919) merchant
- George Klewitz Soward (1857 – 1941), architect and politician
- Tullie Cornthwaite Wollaston (1863–1931) opal dealer

Other individuals interred there include:

- Robert Bungey (1914–1943) fighter pilot of WWII
- Max Pontifex (1910-1998) Australian rules footballer
- Alfred Jabez Roberts OBE (1863–1939), stockbroker, mayor, and sportsman
- William Knox Simms (1830–1897) brewer, businessman and politician
