= Birks Chemists =

Pharmacy in Adelaide, Australia

Birks Chemists is a pharmacy in Adelaide, Australia whose origins date back to the 1850s.

== History ==
George Napier Birks (24 October 1838 – 14 September 1895) and William Hanson Birks (28 December 1841 – 5 August 1925) were sons of Dr. George Vause Birks (c. 1815 – 31 January 1858), who with his wife and family emigrated from England to South Australia on the Leonidas, arriving at Glenelg in December 1853, and settled in Angaston. Dr. Birks begun practising in the town, with his wife and older sons filling prescriptions. Dr. Birks died at 42 years of age, as a result of being thrown from his horse. Mrs Birks then ran a store in Angaston.

In 1856 G. N. Birks started working for FH Faulding & Co at their chemist's shop at 5 Rundle Street, Adelaide as a trainee. Around 1860 he moved to Kooringa, where he dispensed for the two doctors who were practising there, then around two years later moved to Wallaroo mines, where he opened his first shop in 1861, and for many years served as Justice of the Peace. In 1862 he opened a pharmacy in Kadina, installing his brother William as manager. These two businesses later diversified into stationery and books. He opened a third shop at Moonta with his brother John Napier Birks (30 August 1845 – 10 May 1929) as manager. John would in 1879 have his own pharmacy in Port Adelaide, at the corner of St. Vincent Street and Commercial Road, later at 130 William Street, Perth.

Meanwhile in 1864 brother Charles Napier Birks (13 February 1844 – 29 April 1924), in partnership with David Robin (c. 1835 – 24 February 1914) had taken over the softgoods business of G. Shaw at 89 Hindley Street. They would then, in 1871 take over J. Ballantyne & Co.'s store at 38 Rundle Street, so beginning the history of Charles Birks & Co, one of Adelaide's great department stores.

The business prospered and in October 1874 the brothers were able to open a stationery and book store "G.N. & W.H. Birks" at 60 Rundle Street, Adelaide, with William in charge. In August 1888 they moved the stationery shop to premises at 68 Rundle Street.

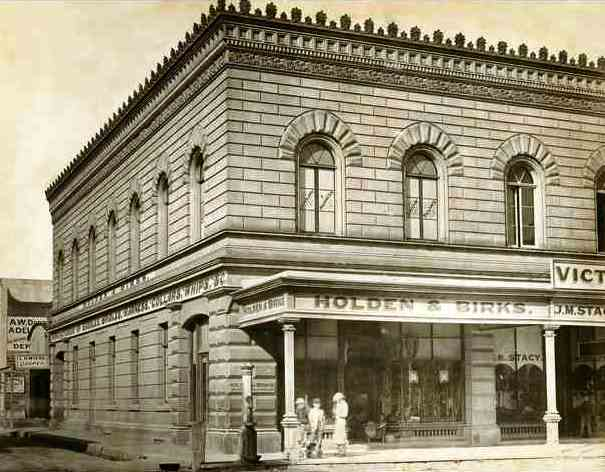
Holden & Birks, 59 Rundle Street became Birks Chemists July 1879, their home for over 120 years

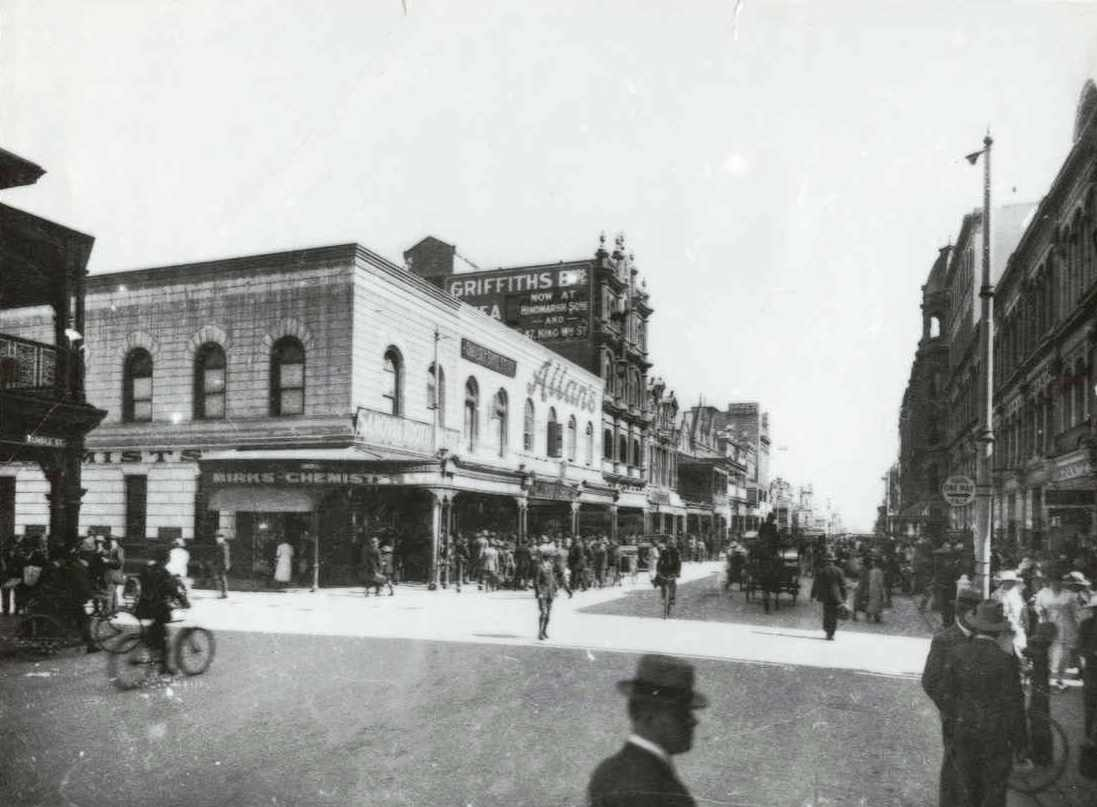
Birks chemists 1920

G.N. & W.H. Birks opened a Homoeopathic Chemists shop at 51 Rundle Street in January 1879, and moved to 59 Rundle Street (on the Gawler Place corner) in July the same year. This building was earlier (1871–1874) the home of retail saddlery and leathergoods business Holden & Birks, a partnership of brother Alfred James Birks (7 June 1840 – 7 December 1873) and James Alexander Holden, founder of the business that became Holden. While the two businesses were registered as G.N. & W.H. Birks, George owned the stationer's at No. 60 and William the chemist's at No. 59 (around 1921-1922 renumbered as No. 57, and in 1973 Rundle Street became Rundle Mall).

In November 1888 they took over F. J. Eyre's newly opened chemist's shop at 6 Rundle Street, which they renamed "Birks Bros.", but relinquished it less than two years later. Frederick James Eyre (c. 1862–1926) established another shop at O'Connell Street, North Adelaide.

George Napier Birks married Helen Rosetta Thomas (30 August 1845 – 3 May 1932) on 28 January 1863. She was the second daughter of William Kyffin Thomas. He and his wife joined the second contingent which left Adelaide on the Royal Tar in January 1894 for William Lane's "New Australia" settlement in Paraguay, along with other members of the Birks family: Alf (1874–1916), Constance (1877–1901), Elma (1893– ), Eric (1890–1948), Frank (1873–1953), Fred (1866–1948) and Grace ( –1937), John Napier (1845–1929), (William) Kyffin (1875–1938), Walter (1847–1900) and Win (1882–1905). George died there; his wife returned to Adelaide.

William Hanson Birks married Adeline Jefferson "Ada" Raymond (c. 1840 – August 1918) of Don River (Tasmania) on 28 August 1863. They had a summer residence in Beaumont; he died in Sydney.

In 1906 William sold the business to Percival R. "Percy" Magarey, son of Dr. Sylvanus Magarey, and took on his younger brother William T. Magarey as an apprentice. The Magareys brought an American drug-store style to the old shop — a marble counter with a soda fountain, syrups and ice-cream, high stools and mirrors. It became a popular meeting spot for the smart younger set. In 1922 A. K. Newberry joined and restructured the business as a limited liability company, which immediately purchased the property from J. Bakewell for £20,000. Donald Magarey, another brother, joined the company, as did Edgar Vincent "EV" Lawton, who was in 1933 to marry Kathleen Elise, a daughter of W. T. Magarey. Newberry retired in 1953, and was replaced as chairman of directors by Lawton.

Birks Chemists manufactured numerous pharmaceutical lines: "Marva" brand of rheumatism wafers, influenza wafers, chilblain liniment, cough mixture, and rheumatic mixture; "Sanovia" toothpaste, toilet cream, dentifrice liquid, dentifrice powder, healing ointment, tooth soap, hair tonic, bouquet perfume, bouquet sachets, toilet powder, medical soap, dental suction powder, depilatory powder, sunburn cream and snail killer; "Capilloid" hair dye and hair restorer, and "Acme" corn cure. In 1920 Birks Chemists became the subject of a legal controversy when they were convicted of illegally selling an alcoholic beverage, Sedna, a "tonic" made from port wine fortified with extracts of coca leaf, kola nut and beef.

In 1933 Birks Chemists bought the premises at 278a Rundle Street near the East End Market and established a pharmacy there, managed by Edgar Lawton, and in 1947 another shop was opened at 147 St Vincent Street, Port Adelaide, managed by Kenneth Wall.

== Family ==
For more information on the extensive Birks family of South Australia see George Vause Birks.

== Bibliography ==
- Gavin Souter (1968) A peculiar people: The Australians in Paraguay Angus & Robertson, Sydney. ISBN 0-207-95037-7
