= John D. Custance =

South Australia scientist

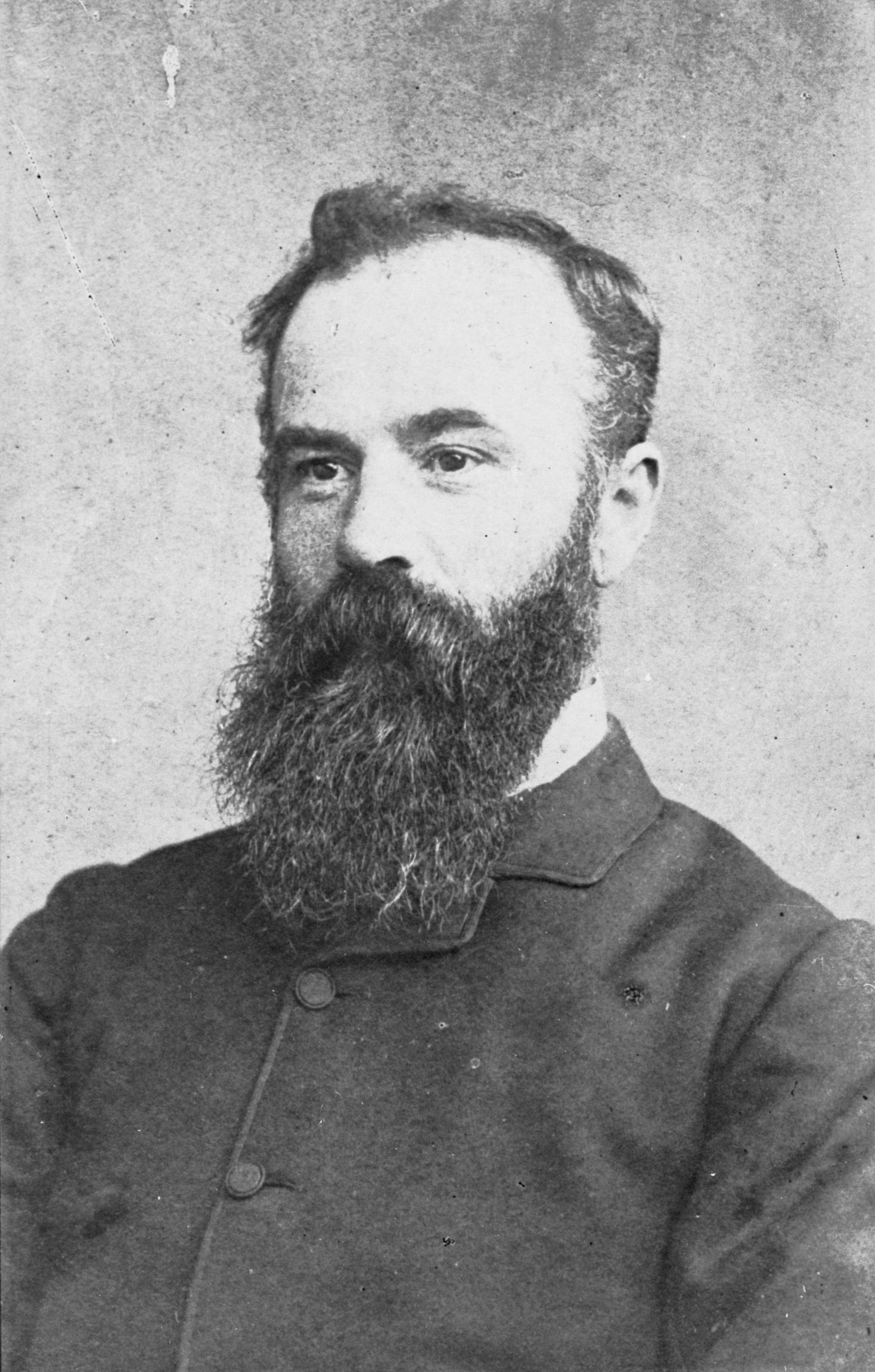
Professor Custance, first Principal of Roseworthy College, c. 1910

John Daniel Custance FCS FRAS (c. 1842 – 14 December 1923) was an agricultural scientist, founder of Roseworthy College, South Australia, but was sacked by a Minister with whom he had mutual antipathy.

== History ==
Custance was a Professor of Agricultural Science at the Royal Agricultural College, Cirencester, and had been for a time appointed to the Imperial College, Japan.

The South Australian Government was concerned about the declining productivity of soils in the colony, where wheat had been grown for less than fifty years. Early in 1881 Sir Arthur Blyth, South Australia's Agent-General in England was charged with finding a suitable person to fill a newly established position of Professor of Agriculture with the University of Adelaide He selected Custance, who in June 1881 was appointed at a salary of £800 per year.

It was envisaged that an institution combining the functions of an Experimental Farm and Agricultural College be established. To this end, Custance, the Commissioner for Crown Lands Alfred Catt, Samuel Davenport and Sir Robert Dalrymple Ross chose a property near Smithfield, which had the merits of being close to the city and a railway station, but their choice was overruled on the grounds the land was too good, and that more useful experiments could be made on land that had been exhausted by wheatgrowing, and the property purchased in 1882 was Olive Hill Farm, of 720 acres (290 ha) at Kangaroo Flat, 3 miles (4.8 km) west of Roseworthy. He arrived unaccompanied, in late July on the s.s. Malwa which left Britain on 1 June.

He started his researches immediately, starting with visits to farms in the various wheatgrowing districts in the colony, but the Agricultural College did not get under way until 1884, and Custance was appointed Honorary Principal, but was hampered in his work by an unwillingness of Parliament to allow him more staff.

Though an excellent teacher and researcher and an able administrator, Custance was by all reports an obstinate and irascible man ("Professor Crusty" was a nickname), and lacked the subtlety which might have won him more battles. Previous ministers with the portfolio Commissioner of Crown Lands and Immigration (Alfred Catt, Jenkin Coles and Thomas Playford) seemed to have coped with his obstinacy, but James Henderson Howe was clearly more interested in maintaining the upper hand than a working relationship. The tipping point came at examination time when Custance requested two examiners and Howe sent three. Nobody would back down and Custance resigned his (honorary) position as Principal on 8 December 1886. Howe thereupon gave Custance three months' notice of the termination of his appointment as Professor. To give vent his displeasure, Howe refused to attend the graduation ceremony, where he was due to present certificates to successful students.

Henry Hewitson McMinnies (26 September 1812 – 25 November 1887), a Cirencester graduate, was appointed his successor in March 1887. He arrived in June, but was too ill to take up his duties on 1 July, resigned and returned to England, where he died from cancer of the tongue and throat. His trips and salary were paid by the South Australian Government, and a generous gratuity beside. By this time Howe was no longer a Cabinet member, and Custance could easily have been reappointed with minimum loss of face, but that was not to be; rather they appointed Professor William Lowrie, with F. H. Molesworth acting while Lowrie came out from England.

Around this time Custance returned to England with his family, and was in London early in 1888. Their third son was born at Ongar, Essex; they moved to the Isle of Wight before returning to South Australia.

Lowrie served for 13 years, then left in 1903, protesting that he was not receiving as high a salary as Custance, and was followed by Professor Towar.

Custance and his family returned to South Australia on the Persic around 27 April 1906, and received considerable recognition for the part he had played in the progress of agriculture in the State. He worked for a time at J. H. Angas's estates "Broadview" at Georgetown, South Australia, then "Collingrove", near Angaston.

At a later Speech Day, mention was made of the successful careers that many of Custance's students had made in agriculture.

In 1923 he wrote a series of articles for The Observer on the history of agriculture in the State. His adventurous son Frederic perished on the Broken Hill track, and he himself died at his home in Black Forest, South Australia at the end of the same year.

== Family ==
John Daniel Custance (c. 1842 – 14 December 1923) married Edith Mary Fowler (c. 1867 – 22 June 1940) of Gawler on 13 August 1883

- John Leslie Custance (29 July 1884 – ) was born at Roseworthy, married Gladys Marion Kentish on 19 July 1919.
- daughter married P. C. Ross, lived at Lower Mitcham
- Francis H. Custance (6 June 1887 – ) married Violet V. Jarmyn of Mallala on 18 February 1938.
- Frederic Cyril Custance (c. May 1890 – 3 June 1923) married Edith Violet Barnet, daughter of William Barnet of The Bunyip, Gawler, on 21 February 1916. Born in Ongar, Essex, he was a Corporal with the Australian Flying Corps during World War I. He died near Olary, South Australia.

== Recognition ==
It is likely that the Electoral district of Custance was named for him.
