= Roseworthy College =

Agricultural college in Roseworthy, Australia

Coordinates: 34.528586°S 138.688233°E

Roseworthy Agricultural College
- Established: 1883
- Location: Roseworthy, South Australia

Roseworthy Agricultural College was an agricultural college in Australia. It was 50 km (31 mi) north of Adelaide and 7 km (4.3 mi) west of Roseworthy town. It was the first agricultural college in Australia, established in 1883. It is now part of Adelaide University.

== History ==
Roseworthy College in 1926

=== Establishment ===
Roseworthy College was the result of an initiative to develop a model farm. The idea was that the college would be an extension of the University of Adelaide and would be run by a Professor of Agriculture. The connection with the University was dropped and in 1882 John D. Custance took up the directorship and in 1883 the college's Main Building was completed. Custance may have been an effective manager but antagonized powerful politicians, and was sacked. In 1887, William Lowrie was appointed principal, but he resigned in 1901 after being criticised in the Parliament. Walter Richard Birks (1886–1960), principal from 1927 to 1932, was a distinguished college alumnus but was forced to resign after students' dissatisfaction culminated in strike action.

In 1936, a full-time Diploma of Oenology was offered. It was taught by Alan R. Hickinbotham and John L. Williams. Another early lecturer was John Fornachon, who did research on bacterial spoilage of fortified wines. Later, Bryce Rankine ran the course.

Research undertaken at the College included the use of fertilisers in dryland cropping and a wheat breeding program, each of their released varieties bearing the name of a bladed weapon. The graduates of the three faculties – Agriculture, Oenology and Natural Resources – were well regarded, and winemaking students were drawn from throughout Australia and New Zealand.

=== Centenary ===
In 1983, the college's centenary publication explained: "The College encompasses approximately 1,200 hectares of land, most of which is used as a teaching and demonstration farm. There are about 500 hectares sown to wheat, barley, oats, oilseed and medic crops, with 10 hectares of orchard, vineyard and vegetable garden. The farm also carries sheep, Poll Shorthorn beef cattle, Jersey and Friesian dairy cattle, pigs, poultry, and a representative range of both light and heavy horses, and some Angora goats ... Roseworthy also has a teaching winery (which includes a distillery) of 150 tonnes production capacity ... The College produces a range of table wines, sherries, ports and brandies."

=== Roseworthy Old Collegians Association ===
Roseworthy Old Collegians Association Incorporated (ROCA) is a University of Adelaide Alumni focused on the Roseworthy Campus. ROCA was created in 1898 and has provided an ongoing bond for the many thousands of people who have been associated with the Campus since Roseworthy was established as Australia's first agricultural college in 1883. It boasts a membership of around 2000 life members and represents one of the bigger groups of the Adelaide University Alumni. ROCA's purpose has always been to promote the interests of the Roseworthy Campus. Its members are very proud of Roseworthy's history and the contribution of its people to society. ROCA acts as a guardian of the traditions of the Campus and provides a link between Old Collegians and the Campus.

=== Merger ===
Roseworthy College remained a separate department of the South Australian government until 1973 when it became a College of Advanced Education under the Education Department, and officially co-educational. Until 1972 it had exclusively male students and was primarily a residential college.

In 1991, the College merged with the University of Adelaide and became the University's Roseworthy Campus, part of the Faculty of Agricultural and Natural Resource Sciences. The merger would see teaching and research in oenology and viticulture transferred to the University's Waite Campus, along with the bulk of its work in plant breeding. (The proposal was controversial at the time, and the Student Union Council (RACSUC) held a wake to emphasize the perceived future of the college/campus under the University of Adelaide.)

From the mid-1990s, the major focus of the campus turned to dryland agriculture, natural resource management and animal production. The campus is also now home to South Australia's first pre-service Veterinary Science training program, which commenced in purpose-built facilities in 2010. In 2013, the focus on veterinary science was expanded with the opening of the Equine Health and Performance Centre, a state-of-the-art facility for equine surgery, sports medicine, internal medicine and reproduction.

== Library ==
The Roseworthy Agricultural College Library was the library located on the campus. It dates back to the former Tassie Memorial Library which was funded by John Tassie in 1920. It was built as a memorial to his son, also named John Tassie, who was a student at the college who died during World War I in France. It was later expanded in 1945 through donations by A Lowrie, the widow of former principal William Lowrie. The William Lowrie Memorial Annexe, which connected to the library in a T-shape, was completed in 1947. The library moved to new building in 1974 due to increasing size constraints with the former site later used as a gymnasium.

== Notable alumni ==
- Ray Beckwith – wine chemist with Penfolds
- Norman Brookman – MLC
- David Brookman – his son, MP for Alexandra
- John Duval – Penfolds' Chief Winemaker 1986–2002, owner and winemaker John Duval Wines (Barossa Valley)
- Joe Darling CBE – Australian Test Cricket Captain, SAFA footballer with Adelaide, Gawler and Norwood Clubs, member of Tasmanian Legislative Council
- Bruce Eastick – South Australian politician and mayor of Gawler
- Peter Gago – Penfolds winemaker
- Dean Hewitson – owner and winemaker at Hewitson winery in the Barossa Valley
- Brian Jefferies AM – sheep breeding scientist and sheep extension officer
- Rex Kuchel – forensic scientist and botanist
- David Lithgow Lewis OAM – agricultural and humanitarian worker
- David Lowe – owner and winemaker Lowe Wines (Mudgee), president NSW Wine Industry Association, vice-president Australian Winemakers Federation
- Neil McGuigan – CEO, Australian Vintage Ltd
- Bill Moularadellis – owner, managing director & winemaker Kingston Estate, non-executive member of Wine Australia
- Trevor Norton – mayor of District Council of Loxton Waikerie and 5RM sports broadcaster
- Jeremy Oliver – Australian independent wine writer
- Philip Shaw – owner & winemaker HOOSEGG Wines, previously owner & winemaker at Philip Shaw Wines, both of Orange, New South Wales

== Principals ==
- John Daniel Custance 1882–1887
- William Lowrie 1887–1901
- James De Loss Towar (see below) 1902–1904
- Arthur James Perkins 1904–1914
- Walter John Colebatch 1914–1927
- Walter Richard Birks 1927–1932
- Allan Robert Callaghan 1932–1949
- Robert Nicholson McCulloch 1949–1961
- Robert "Bob" Herriot 1962–1973

=== James De Loss Towar ===
Towar was a practical farmer, born on a farm near Lansing, Michigan and in 1891 became an assistant at the Rhode Island Experimental Station, and later appointed associate professor at the Rhode Island Agricultural College. In 1898 he was appointed Agriculturist at the Michigan Agricultural College. He qualified BSc in 1885 and MSc in 1901. He married Hannah Louise Proseus in 1890, had a son born c. 1893. He had a senior position with the University of Wyoming 1907–1910 and acting president in 1908. He may have quit Roseworthy due to discipline problems, including a student break-in of the wine cellar, but made no public statements.
