= Evan Kyffin Thomas =

South Australian editor and newspaper proprietor

Evan Kyffin Thomas (1866 – 27 July 1935) was an editor and newspaper proprietor in South Australia.

== History ==
Thomas was a son of William Kyffin Thomas and grandson of Robert Thomas and followed in their footsteps in the newspaper business. Most, if not all, members of the family carried the middle name "Kyffin" and "Kyffin Thomas" was often treated as a double-barrelled surname. He joined the literary staff of the "Regíster" in 1885, and editor of the Observer then partner and general manager in 1899. He was elected chairman of the Adelaide committee of the Australian section of the Empire Press Union at the Empire press conference in 1925, and deputy chairman of the Australian section of the Empire Press Union for 1929–30, and deputy chairman of the Australian delegation to the Empire Press Conference in London in 1930.

A very fine representative of a very fine family which played a big part in the early annals of the State . . . Evan Kyffin Thomas was loved and respected by all. It was a thousand pities that the arrival of the commercial age in Adelaide has deprived us of the paper which the Thomases controlled. South Australia has fallen upon lamentable times. Her businesses have been eaten up by firms run by Eastern capital, her industries have shifted to the Eastern States, her press is manipulated from the east. All that we have left is a string of non-paying agricultural and pastoral industries, and a motorbody business whose future in the State is precarious and whose ownership is largely American.

== Family ==
Evan Kyffin Thomas married Mary "Maisie" Harriet Archer Smith (8 October 1878 – 6 March 1942) on 1 June 1901. Their children included:

- Rendel Kyffin Thomas (9 February 1905 – 1985) married Ngaroma Rutherford ( – ) on 18 September 1937 in England. Ngaroma was a sister of Minnie Hope Rutherford, who married Mr. J. Langdon Bonython in 1926.
- Archer Kyffin Thomas (30 October 1906 – 1978) married Judy Thomas ( – ) on 20 October 1939. Judy was a daughter of Col. Leonard Rhys Thomas (c. 1882–1948) DSO MBE, SA manager of ABC radio. Archer, editor of the Melbourne Herald for 11 years, was killed in a car crash.
- (Mary) Dorothea Kyffin "Dolly" Thomas (15 September 1908 – ) married Randall Robert Parker ( – 1965) on 6 February 1932

Their home for many years was "Branksome", Glenelg.

Home movies shot by Evan Kyffin Thomas and his son Rendel in the 1930s "document the life of extraordinary wealth and privilege enjoyed by the Adelaide establishment at the time".
