= William Kyffin Thomas =

Australian newspaper publisher

William Kyffin Thomas (4 November 1821 – 4 July 1878) was a newspaper proprietor in South Australia. William, the son of Robert Thomas, was born in Fleet Street, London and emigrated to South Australia with his father in 1836 on the Africaine. From that time until the day of his death, he was intimately associated with the fortunes of the South Australian Register, for the last twenty-five years of his life as one of the proprietors. To his industry and ability in the different capacities in which he acted was due to a large extent the high character and phenomenal success of the Register, and the weekly and afternoon journals issued from the same office—the Adelaide Observer and Evening Journal. The firm which conducted these papers bore the name of the subject, being known as W. K. Thomas & Co., and consisted of John Harvey Finlayson and Robert Kyffin Thomas, the latter being the elder son of William Kyffin Thomas, and grandson of the founder of the Register.

Thomas was a founding member of the Flinders Street Baptist Church and served as its secretary for many years. He died on 4 July 1878 in Glenelg, South Australia and was buried in West Terrace Cemetery. William was survived by his wife Mary Jane, née Good, six daughters and three sons.

== Family ==
William Kyffin Thomas (4 November 1821 – 4 July 1878) married Mary Jane Good (c. 1826 – 17 November 1901) on 28 January 1843. Their children included

- Mary Maria Thomas (c. 1843 – 18 March 1878) married Charles Napier Birks (13 February 1844 – 29 April 1924) on 13 September 1866
- Helen Rosetta Thomas (c. 1845 – 3 May 1932) married George Napier Birks (24 October 1838 – 14 September 1895) on 28 January 1863. George died in Paraguay; he was the a brother of Charles Napier Birks, founder of the Rundle Street store.
- Frances Thomas (1847–1926) married William Neill (c.1846 – 10 December 1929) on 29 October 1869

- Rosalie Clyde Neill (1876–1940) married William Salter "Will" Birks (1871–1940) on 8 March 1900. He was a son of Alfred James Birks (1840–1873) and grandson of Dr George Vause Birks (1815–1858).
- Kenneth William Neill (1880–1972) married Hilda Napier Crooks (1875–1973) on 27 March 1907. She was a granddaughter of Dr George Vause Birks (1815–1858).

- Sir Robert Kyffin Thomas (19 August 1851 – 13 June 1910) married Amelia Bowen (c. 1855 – 15 July 1922) in 1876. See his entry for family details.
- Rosetta Jane "Rose" Thomas (12 March 1856 – 3 October 1911) married Charles Napier Birks (1844–1924) on 8 March 1879. Rose was a noted suffragist.
- Florence Emily Thomas (1860 – 20 August 1922) married J(abez) Edwin Thomas (c. 1853 – 10 September 1920) on 22 September 1881. Edwin was not a near relative. He was an accountant, business partner of William Neill (above).

- Florence Gwenyth Thomas (1887–1971) married Rev. S(amuel) Raymond Baron Cornish ( –1963) in London on 5 August 1927. They built Stangate House, Aldgate, (bequeathed to National Trust of South Australia) in 1940.

- Margaret Edith Thomas (1862 – 10 October 1946)
- Annie Isabel Kyffin Thomas (19 June 1864 – 21 November 1948) married Dr George Bessant Mallam MRCS LRCP (11 May 1843 – 28 August 1910) of Oxford on 30 July 1884. Dr Mallam was an uncle of Judge Mallam of the N.T. Supreme Court.

- Capt. Clifford Angus Mallam, MC (4 March 1890 – 28 October 1918), with 3rd Bn., Royal Berkshire Regiment, British Army, was killed in action in WWI.

- Evan Kyffin Thomas (1866 – 27 July 1935) married Mary Harriet Archer "Maisie" Smith (c. 1878 – 6 March 1942) on 1 June 1901. He was a journalist with the Register, editor of the Observer then partner and general manager. Their children included:

- Rendel Kyffin Thomas (9 February 1905 – 1985) married Ngaroma Rutherford ( – ) on 18 September 1937. She was a sister of Minnie Hope Rutherford, who married Mr J. Langdon Bonython in 1926.
- Archer Kyffin Thomas (30 October 1906 – 26 November 1978) married Judy Thomas on 20 October 1939. Judy was daughter of Col. Leonard Rhys Thomas (c. 1882–1948) DSO MBE, SA manager of ABC radio. Archer, editor of the Melbourne Herald for 11 years, was killed in a car crash.
- (Mary) Dorothea Kyffin "Dolly" Thomas (15 September 1908 – ) married Randall Robert Parker on 6 February 1932
