= Charles Birks & Co =

Australian business

Charles Birks & Co Ltd.
- Industry: Retail
- Founded: October 1864; 161 years ago (as Robin & Birks)
- Founder: Charles Birks; David Robin
- Defunct: 1954; 72 years ago
- Fate: Acquired by David Jones
- Area served: South Australia

Charles Birks & Co Ltd., or simply Birks, was a South Australian department store founded by Charles Birks in Rundle Street, Adelaide, in 1864. His son Napier Birks took over the business in 1908. The business was acquired by David Jones in 1954, but continued to operate as Birks until the new David Jones building was erected on the site of the old department store.

== History ==
Charles Birks (13 February 1844 – 29 April 1924) was born in Knutsford, near Manchester, England, and emigrated with his parents Hannah Napier Birks (6 May 1807 – 13 August 1883) and Dr. George Vause Birks (c. 1815 – 31 January 1858) and family on the Leonidas, arriving at Glenelg, South Australia in December 1853. They settled in Angaston, where his father began practising. He died four years later, as a result of being thrown from his horse. Mrs Birks then ran a store in Angaston, assisted by her sons William and George, who as W. H & G. N. Birks later opened a stationery shop and Birks Chemists in Rundle Street.

Charles Birks & Co.

David Robin (c. 1835 – 24 February 1914) and Charles Birks, as Robin & Birks, took over the "London House" drapery shop at 89 Hindley Street from George Shaw (c. 1815 – 1895) in October 1864. Their next takeover was J. Ballantyne & Co.'s store at 38 Rundle Street in October 1871. The partnership was dissolved on 24 January 1876, when Robin took over the Hindley Street (At that time the major shopping strip and the more prestigious location) store, which in 1882/83 he sold to Joseph Henry Pellew (1854–1904).

Charles took the Rundle Street property, which he rebranded Charles Birks', and, assisted by Harry Ingham ( –1883), spared no expense in establishing the store at the upper end of the market. In 1879 he took his brother Walter Richard Birks (1847–1900) and William Honeywill (c. 1853–1929) into partnership, in 1881 rebranding the business as Charles Birks & Co.; Henry Joseph Bailey and George Mowat were later admitted. Charles Birks retired from active involvement in 1884; Bailey and Mowat retired in 1886, and George bought out Walter's share shortly after. In 1888 a major building expansion was undertaken. In 1893 Charles's son Napier Kyffin Birks (1876–1953) was taken on as an office boy, then in 1900 was made a partner, then sole proprietor when Charles relinquished his share in 1908.

In 1913 Napier Birks purchased the whole of the Rundle Street frontage from Stephens Place to Gawler Place, and rebuilt the store. He appointed Frank Edward Cornish (1863–1930), who had been with the firm since age 12, as general manager, and when he enlisted in the Great War in July 1915 put Cornish in charge. The firm was restructured as a limited liability company in late 1920, with Cornish appointed a director. Two new partners who bought into the company were Edmund Arnold Farr (died 1957) and William Gilbert Hayes (died 1926). In 1932 the company purchased the warehouse of Good, Toms & Co., increasing the total floor area to 4 acres (1.6 ha), and increasing Charles Birks & Co.'s frontage along Stephens Place and Gawler Place.

The business was acquired by David Jones in 1954, but continued to operate as Birks until 1961 or 1962, when the new David Jones building was erected on the site.

== Gallery ==
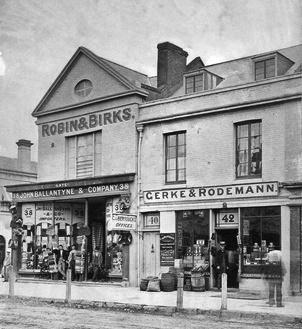
Robin & Birks showroom Hindley Street c. 1865

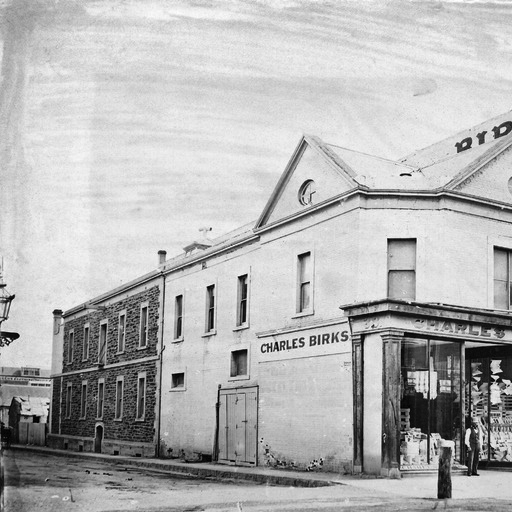
Charles Birks drapery store NE corner Rundle Street and Stephens Place c. 1872

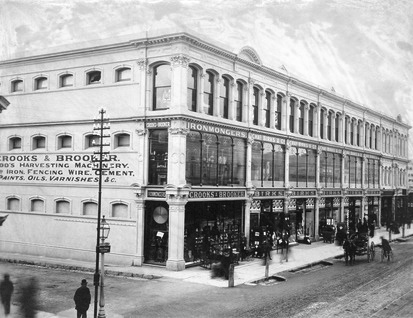
Charles Birks drapery store NE corner Rundle Street and Stephens Place c. 1900

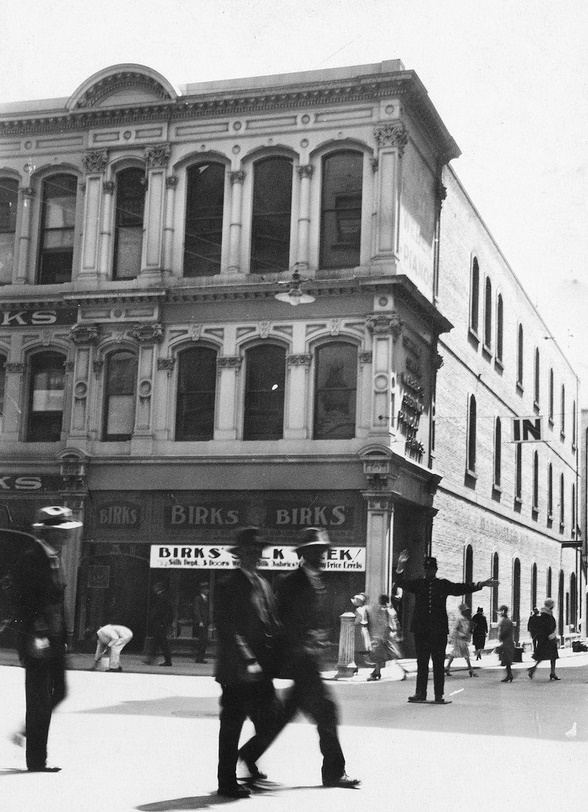
Charles Birks drapery store NW corner Rundle Street and Gawler Place c. 1920

== Family ==
For details on the extended family see George Vause Birks.

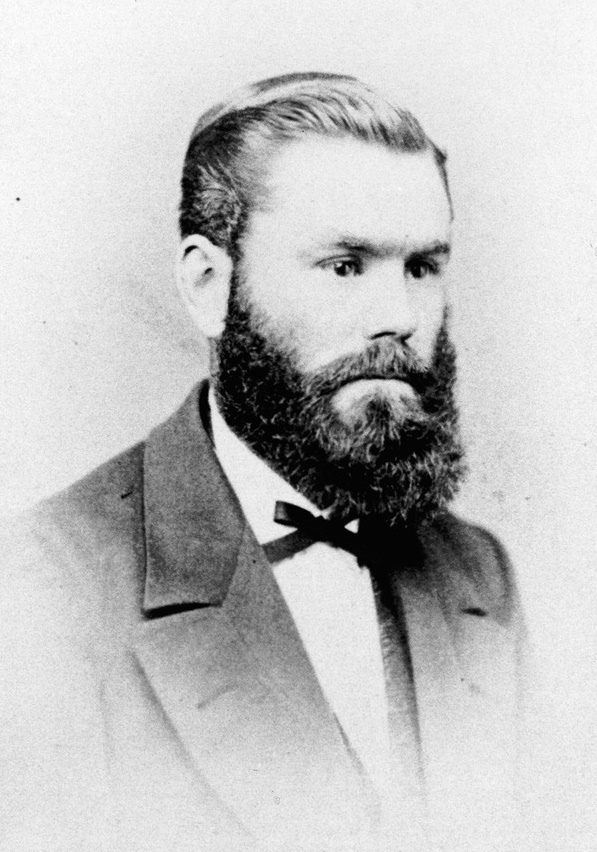
Charles Birks

- Charles Birks (13 February 1844 – 29 April 1924), generally known as Charles Birks (without middle name), married Mary Maria Thomas (c. 1843 – 18 March 1878) on 13 September 1866; they had six children. He married again, to Rosetta Jane "Rose" Thomas (12 March 1856 – 3 October 1911) on 8 March 1879. Mary and Rose were first and fifth daughters of William Kyffin Thomas. He married once more, to Alice May Hone (1878–1953), a sister of Dr. F. S. Hone, on 11 September 1913, lived "Felton", Lefevre Terrace, North Adelaide, then from 1914 at "Avonlea", 32 Northcote Tce., Gilberton. She married again, to George E. Goodhart, on 20 December 1926.

- Mary Frances Birks (26 September 1867 – 1 June 1916)
- Helen Napier "Nellie" Birks (20 June 1869 – 27 January 1949) married Charles Hedley Phillipps "Hedley" Fisher (c. 1860 – 25 November 1938), son of Daniel Fisher MP on 14 February 1898

- Margaret Beatrice Fisher (1898–1987) married John Neetlee "Jack" Bagot (17 December 1898 – 1977) on 11 June 1932. Jack was a grandson of Edward Meade Bagot.
- Sybil Helen Fisher (1903–1995) married Frederick Winsloe Hall (14 May 1899 – 1953) on 10 June 1933

- Edith Vause Birks (9 May 1871 – 1959) married Dr. Charles Henry Reissmann ( – ) on 31 July 1900; they changed their names to Riceman, lived at Mt. Lofty.

- Nora Frances Reissmann/Riceman (20 April 1902 – ) married Ronald Nicholas Lamond Hopkins (1897–1990) in 1926. He was SA's highest military officer.
- Sidney Mary Reissmann (2 September 1905 – ) left for England to pursue her pianoforte and Dalcroze eurhythmics interests.
- Barbara Meredith Reissmann/Riceman (4 May 1907 – 1996) married Edward Lauriston Phillips (1892–1971) in 1936
- David Stirling Reissmann/Riceman (30 September 1910 – 2001) married Nancy Helen Magarey (1915–2005), a great-granddaughter of Thomas Magarey. He was a scientist with Waite Research, CSIR, pioneer of soil trace elements, president of Legacy (SA).

- Catherine Louise Birks (Katherine?) (14 April 1873 – 1930) married Norman McDougall ( – ) in Beddgelert, Wales, on 12 September 1900
- Margaret Eason Birks (6 February 1875 – 12 November 1950) married Walter Fowler-Brownsworth ( – ) on 23 August 1913
- Napier Kyffin Birks (21 January 1876 – 22 August 1953) married Lucy McDougall ( – 26 January 1951) on 11 September 1899, lived The Parade, Norwood, then 3 Springfield Ave., Springfield

- Edith Napier Birks (9 June 1900 – c. 1975) was an artist, arts administrator and speedboat racer.
- Leslie Napier Birks (30 December 1904 – 14 July 1929) killed in light aircraft crash
- Norman Napier Birks (6 September 1906 – 17 February 1949) married Patricia Baines Bruce (1912– ) on 28 June 1932. He was managing director of Motors Ltd., Adelaide, and original 1925 member Cambridge University Air Squadron.
