= William Lowrie =

Australian educationist (1857–1933)

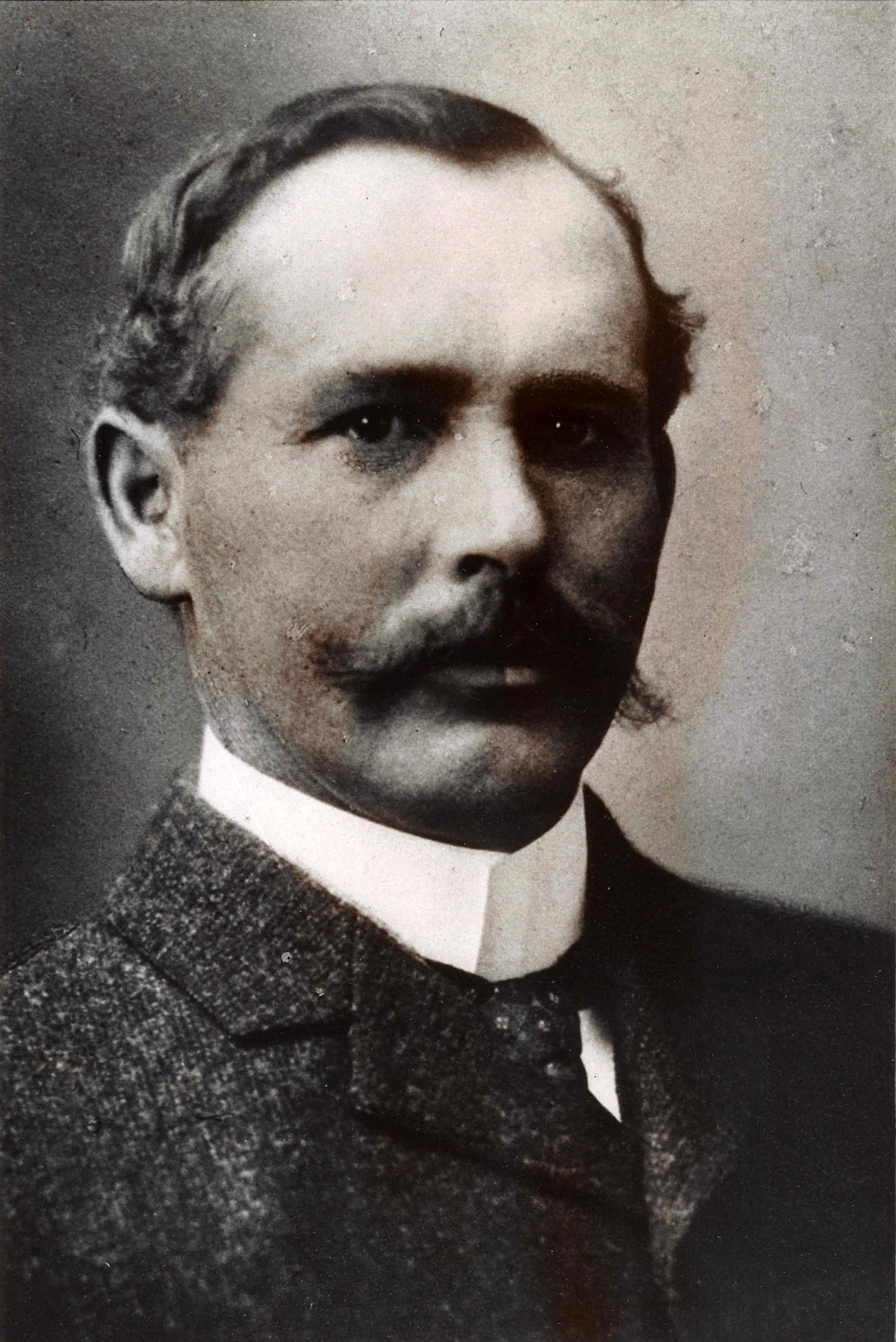
William Lowrie (1900s)

William Lowrie (18 October 1857 – 20 July 1933) was an Australian agricultural educationist.

Lowrie was the son of John Lowrie, a shepherd, wife Christina, née Anderson. Lowrie was born near Galashiels, Selkirkshire, Scotland. Lowrie was brought up on a farm Clarilaw, one of the largest farms in Roxburghshire, and attended school at Blainslie; he later entered the University of Edinburgh, where he graduated M.A. in 1883, and obtaining a Highland and Agricultural Society's bursary in 1884, studied agriculture and graduated B.Sc. in 1886 with a prize in mathematics and several first-class honours. Lowrie lectured on natural science and agriculture at Gordon's College, Aberdeen.

In 1887 he was appointed Professor at the Roseworthy Agricultural College, South Australia, after the sacking of John D. Custance, and continued his research into the virtues of fallowing and the use of water-soluble phosphates as fertilizer. Following this Lowrie travelled throughout the wheat-growing districts of South Australia, addressing farmers and endeavouring to persuade them to adopt his methods. He resigned his position as principal of Roseworthy Agricultural College after criticism of him in Parliament. He was urged to reconsider by the Agricultural and Horticultural Society and others. W. C. Grasby was appointed as Head Master, freeing Lowrie to concentrate on research and promulgation of modern farming methods and the resignation was withdrawn. He was contracted by the Victorian government to report on the Longerenong and Dookie agricultural colleges. His reports, which were constructive though highly critical, were not welcomed.

He was made an honorary and contributing member of the R.A.& H.S.S.A. in 1898 as a show of confidence in him.

In 1901 he left for a position in Canterbury, New Zealand as principal of the Lincoln Agricultural College, then in 1908 became Director of Agriculture in Western Australia where his brother-in-law, Newton Moore, was premier. In 1909 he declined the offer of the chair of agriculture at the University of Sydney. Lowrie returned to South Australia in 1911 as Director of Agriculture, following the resignation of Professor William Angus (and acting directorship of A. E. V. Richardson). Lowrie resigned in 1914 owing to differences of opinion with the Minister for Agriculture regarding the reorganization of the department. After his retirement Lowrie took up farming on 'Battunga', near Echunga, South Australia and specialized in farming and breeding pure-bred Border Leicester sheep.

Lowrie died at Echunga on 20 July 1933 and was buried at St George's cemetery, Magill. Lowrie had married twice, firstly to Mary Longbottom on 24 June 1891; she died four months later after an ectopic pregnancy. On 23 March 1903 Lowrie married Alice Longbottom (Mary's sister) who survived him. There were no children. Lowrie did excellent work, especially in South Australia; no one else in his time did more to make farming profitable. A bust of him, by Marguerite Richardson, is at Roseworthy Agricultural College.
