= Hübbe (surname) =

Hübbe is a surname of Danish or German origin, which is properly Anglicized as Huebbe. Notable people with this surname include:

- Edith Agnes Hübbe, born Edith Agnes Cook (1859–1942), pioneering educator in South Australia
- Nikolaj Hübbe (born 1967), artistic director of the Royal Danish Ballet
- Rica Hübbe, American medical doctor and teacher
- Ulrich Hübbe (1805–1892), German emigrant to South Australia, associated with land titles reform
