= Stawell School =

Private girls' school in Australia (1927–1940)

Stawell School was a short-lived (1927–1940) private school for girls founded by Mabel Hardy and Patience Hawker near the summit of Mount Lofty.

== History ==
Mabel Phyllis Hardy (1890–1977) was born in Malvern, South Australia, a member of the once wealthy Hardy family. She was educated at several State schools and taught at Tormore House School and Unley Park School to fund part-time studies at the University of Adelaide, completing her BA in 1914. She then taught at elite girls' grammar schools in North Adelaide and Sydney, and in 1923 was appointed senior mistress of the newly founded Woodlands Girls Grammar School in Glenelg, South Australia. In 1925 she met a new member of staff, Patience Hawker (1900–1994), who had ideas about forming a school of her own. The following year while on holidays in England and on the Continent, Mabel decided the time had come, and instructed Patience to secure a suitable premises in the Adelaide Hills.

Patience, whose grandfather was George Charles Hawker (1818–1895), and whose family were in comfortable circumstances, purchased "Arthur's Seat", a large bungalow on 90 acres (36 ha) near the summit of Mount Lofty and overlooking the Adelaide Plains. It was largely financed with a loan from her mother, and the school was named in her honour, she having been born Mary Stawell.

The land was for some time owned by Mabel's grandfather Arthur Hardy (1817–1909) and leased to George Tinline, who started on the building before he abruptly left South Australia in 1863, and was completed by the next tenant, Gavin Young, who named it "Arthur's Seat", for a hill overlooking Edinburgh. The next owner was Henry Teesdale Smith, followed by Arthur Hugh Poole.

It was decided to run the School as a company Stawell School Ltd., which was incorporated on 21 December 1926 with Patience Hawker as managing director. The two women made the house their residence, with rooms for boarders, and had classrooms built away from the residence. Mabel had considerable experience with a variety of institutions, but modelled Stawell on what she knew of Frensham, one of many schools at which Patience had studied, and one which had inspired her with the care and kindness given the students. Part of their philosophy of teaching was Helen Parkhurst's Dalton system which gives the student a great deal of control over her own work, where the teacher is a resource and adviser rather than a lecturer, and students are encouraged to aid one another's learning at large round tables. She believed students should feel safe, free, comfortable and well fed, in pleasant surroundings with access to good books, bright pictures and open air. Mabel went to some pains to assert the social acceptability of her school. The girls, almost without exception would have come from privileged backgrounds, and would be expected to enter into a comfortable marriage or through university into a profession, perhaps both. Habits of self-reliance, co-operation and consideration for others were inculcated. Domestic arts such as cooking and management of servants were part of life for the boarders. Stawell's curriculum was strong on social skills: dancing, music, drawing, needlework, public speaking, drama, sports, current events, domestic science, languages, Scripture but above all, English literature. Mabel had no love for public examinations, though many of her students performed well in English and History, but with Stawell offering only General Science and basic mathematics, many university courses were out of reach for the Stawell alumnus. Patience married in 1928 and henceforth had little to do with teaching or day-to-day decisions, though she retained the title and responsibilities of managing director. The school was highly successful for its first ten years, but in the early 1930s the Great Depression brought economic hardship to farmers, whose daughters made up a good percentage of students, and development of social graces for daughters was seen as an expendable luxury. Later in the decade fear of war and petrol rationing were disincentives to families having their daughters too far away from home. Enrolments declined and with declaration of war in 1939 the school shifted to 84 Mills Terrace, North Adelaide and closed in December 1940.

== Postscript ==
Following closure of school on Mount Lofty, the property was leased to the Australian Army and used by the Australian Women's Army Service then in 1943 sold by Patience Howard and Mabel Hardy to Basil Harford. The National Broadcasting Service purchased a substantial section for the ABC-TV transmitter building and mast. Nancy Harford still owned the place on 16 February 1983 when it was destroyed in the Ash Wednesday bushfires. "Arthur's Seat" and "St Michael's House", the Anglican theological college and priory, were the only two significant buildings which were never rebuilt. The property is now part of Cleland National Park, owned by the South Australian Government.

Patience Hawker married (Charles) Roy Howard (1891 – 17 August 1935), a grandson of W. R. Cave, at Bungaree on 19 September 1928. They had two daughters, Lucinda (1929– ) and Virginia (1 October 1931 – ). With the death of her husband in 1935, Patience sold their Crafers property and returned with her two children to East Bungaree, where she lived with her father and brother until 1940. Her daughters attended Stawell School until it closed. She joined the Labor Party and stood unsuccessfully for blue-ribbon Liberal seats in the Assembly in 1946 and the Legislative Council (the first woman contender) in 1953.

Mabel retired, though taking the occasional teaching job. She changed residences several times, finally to Fullarton, where she died.

== Sources ==
- Barbara Wall A Short History of Stawell School: The forgotten school on Mount Lofty published for Mount Lofty Districts Historical Society by Peacock Publications 2012 ISBN 978-1-921601-69-9
