= Mabel Hardy (educator) =

South Australian educator (1890–1977)

Mabel Phyllis Hardy (11 April 1890 – 5 October 1977) was a South Australian educator who, with Patience Hawker founded Stawell School for girls, which ran from 1927 to 1940.

== History ==
Mabel was a granddaughter of Arthur Hardy (1817–1909) and Martha Hardy, née Price (1821–1904), and daughter of Herbert Mansell Hardy (1856–1927) and Miriam Isabella Hardy, née Cunningham (1855–1950). Mabel and her brother Frederick Mansell Hardy (died 1965) were twins, born prematurely, yet each was to have a long and fulfilling life. The family fortune, once considerable, was quite dissipated, and Mabel was brought up in respectable middle-class Malvern. She was educated at a small school run by the Misses Hack, who lived opposite. She then studied in State schools in Gilles Street and Grote Street. A bursary allowed her to study for a few years at the Jacob sisters' Tormore House School in North Adelaide. Caroline Jacob gave her a position at Tormore House, then from 1907 to 1911 at her Unley Park School, teaching English and History, and the money earned funded evening studies at the University of Adelaide. She won the Tinline Scholarship in History and the John Howard Clark scholarship in English Literature, and graduated BA in 1914. From 1916 to 1918 she taught at St Peter's College Girls' School in North Adelaide. Following her interest in history, from 1919 to 1921 she worked as a researcher for George Pitt at the South Australian Archives. She next taught at the Church of England Girls' Grammar School (closed 1929) in Bowral, New South Wales, then in 1923 was appointed senior mistress under Dora Gillam at the newly opened Woodlands Girls Grammar School in Glenelg, South Australia. In 1925 she met a new member of staff, Patience Hawker, who had ideas about forming a school of her own based on Frensham School, where she had enjoyed life as a student. Mabel spent the following year in England and on the Continent, studying teaching methods and curricula.

With a loan from her mother, Patience purchased the mansion "Arthur's Seat" in Crafers, South Australia near the summit of Mount Lofty. Patience and Mabel made the mansion, renamed "Stawell", their residence, with rooms for boarders, and had classrooms built away from the residence. Part of their philosophy of teaching was Helen Parkhurst's Dalton system which gives the student a great deal of control over her own work, where the teacher is a resource and adviser rather than a lecturer, and students are encouraged to aid one another's learning. Patience, who held the position of managing director of the company structured to run the school, quit teaching in 1928 and left Mount Lofty to marry and raise a family. Though maintaining her friendship with Mabel, she had little more to do with teaching or day-to-day decisions. Mabel's school was highly successful for its first ten years, but with the Great Depression of the 1930s enrolments declined, and with declaration of war in 1939 the school shifted to 84 Mills Terrace, North Adelaide, and closed in December 1940.

Mabel Hardy moved in with her mother at 4 Thornber Street, Unley Park, formerly Kyre College for boys. The well-known educator Ellen Thornber also lived on Thornber street, at number 39. Unley Park School for Girls, later a branch of Tormore House School, which Mabel once attended, was at number 37. Semi-retired, she took occasional teaching jobs: some months at Prince Alfred College in 1941 and a year at Woodlands in 1944, and kept in close touch with her ex-students. She moved back to the Hills, not far from the Mount Lofty Railway Station, then around 1951 to Hawthorn, then finally to 74a Fisher Street, Fullarton, where she died.

== Bibliography ==
Mabel Hardy wrote a number of substantial local histories:

- A History of the Hardy Family in South Australia (1959) unpublished, typescript held by State Library of South Australia, D. 3919T.
- The History of Education and Religion in South Australia 1837–1856; Tinline thesis, University of Adelaide, 1915
- A History of Crafers (1939) Crafers Centenary Committee
- History of Woodville, South Australia Vol. I: 1837 – 1874, Vol. II: 1875–1960; Corporation of the City of Woodville (1960)
- The Church of Saint Columba, Hawthorn, South Australia: the first sixty years 1897–1957
- The First Hundred Years of the Orphan Home, Adelaide (1960) about the origins of the Julia Farr Centre
- For happiness in later years : the history of the Cottage Homes Inc. 1872–1986; Adelaide, based on research by M. Hardy; Cottage Homes Inc., (1986) ISBN 1862523282

== Sources ==
- Barbara Wall A Short History of Stawell School: The forgotten school on Mount Lofty published for Mount Lofty Districts Historical Society by Peacock Publications 2012 ISBN 978-1-921601-69-9
