= Eulalie Dawson =

Australian medical practitioner

Eulalie Hardy Hanton Dawson (née Burnard; 21 December 1883 – 5 September 1907) was one of the first women graduates in medicine at the University of Adelaide. A promising career was cut short by her death less than two years after graduating.

== Early life and education ==
Eulalie Hardy Hanton Burnard was born at the schoolhouse, Unley, 21 December 1883. Her mother was Alice Hardy Burnard née Hanton. Her father was Richard Thomas Burnard, Methodist lay preacher and teacher at Thebarton 1874–1881; head master of Unley School 1881–1889, Moonta Mines 1889–1891, Gawler 1891–1895, Flinders Street 1895–1912, and Unley again, 1912–1918. He was prominent in the boards of management of Our Boys' Institute and the League of Empire.

Dawson attended her fathers' schools until 1896 when, having won a bursary, she commenced in the fourth class at the Advanced School for Girls, and after a highly successful scholastic career, matriculated in 1899. She studied science and medicine at the University of Adelaide, and graduated MB BS with first-class honours in December 1905.

== Career ==
She commenced work as honorary surgeon at Adelaide Hospital in 1906.

She married fellow graduate Dr. Dean Dawson (13 March 1881 – 18 March 1939) of "Sunnybrae", Laura on 23 March 1907, and moved into her new home. They took over the Laura practice of Clement Wells, who succeeded Frederic J. Chapple as medical superintendent of Adelaide Hospital. A few months later, she was found to have an abscess on her spine. An operation proved futile and she died in the North Adelaide private hospital, 5 September 1907.
