= Constance May Cooper =

Australian medical doctor (1881 – 1964)

Constance May Cooper (27 April 1881 – 1964) was a medical doctor in South Australia.

Cooper was born in Adelaide, a daughter of George Windham Cooper (1857–1906) and Bertha Hannah Cooper, née Bostock, who married in 1880; George was a wool expert of Elder, Smith, & Co., Ltd, and son of newspaperman George Lindsey Cooper. Her mother was a stalwart worker for the WCTU and the Baptist Sunday school.

Cooper was a student of the Advanced School for Girls and the School of Medicine at the University of Adelaide. She was equal first in her third year, and recommended for the Elder Prize in Medicine, and the Everard scholarship in her fifth year. She graduated MB and BS and was singled out for roasting at the Commemoration celebration. She was appointed a resident medical officer at the Adelaide Hospital in December 1904, along with Phoebe Chapple and three male doctors.

In 1907 she volunteered for a two-year honorary medical position at Fureedpore (modern Faridpur), a Baptist mission in East Bengal, sailing by the Orontes in November

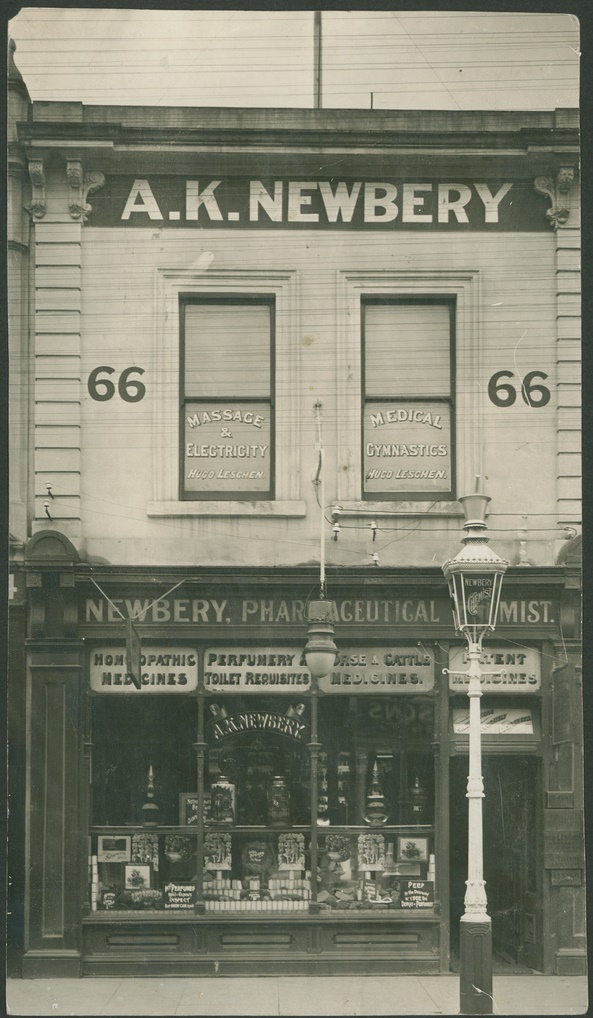
Newbery Chemist, Rundle Street c. 1910

In 1909 she married Arthur Kent Newbery in London before returning to Adelaide. Newbury had a chemist shop in Norwood from 1900, and from 1904 at 66 Rundle Street. In 1911 he sold the lease to F. C. Catt, the draper, and merged his business with that of Birks Chemists, becoming a director of that company.

Nothing has been found of their later activities.

== Family ==
Cooper married Arthur Kent Newbery (1877–1954) in London on 10 May 1909. They had two sons:

- George Arthur Newbery (10 November 1911 – 1976) worked as a storeman at Birks Chemists until his death in 1976. He took no part in social or civic activities. His ashes were interred with his parents' remains.
- Kent Newbery (2 March 1918 – 29 August 1942) died when the Lancaster bomber on which he was deployed was shot down over Nuremberg.
