= Ellen Ida Benham =

(1871-1917) educationist

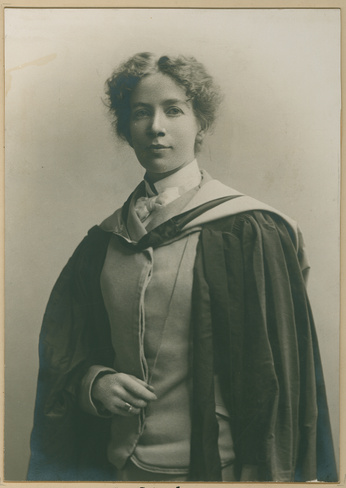
Ellen Ida Benham, 1907

Ellen Ida Benham (12 March 1871 – 27 April 1917) was a science teacher, headmistress and education pioneer in South Australia.

== History ==
Ellen was born at "Talarno", Kapunda, South Australia to solicitor William Hoare Benham (27 November 1833 – ), who arrived in South Australia aboard The Gipsy in August 1853, and his second wife Amie Benham née Huggins. Her father worked as a shearer for three years and drove bullocks before settling down as a lawyer's clerk and studying law.

W. H. Benham was born in Hayes, near Uxbridge, Middlesex. At age 12 he embarked on a four-year apprenticeship to John Boyce, a chemist of Chertsey, Surrey, but in 1849 his parents moved to Brook Green, Hammersmith, London, and he was obliged to break his contract, and he found employment as office boy for a lawyer in Essex Street, Strand, London. His health broke down and he was advised to seek the warmer climate of South Australia, and emigrated aboard Gipsy which arrived in August 1853. Fellow passengers included Lionel Pelham, who was drowned in the SS Gothenburg disaster, A. J. Tolley, and Mr. Holden. With most of the able-bodied men at the Victorian goldfields seeking their fortune, there was little call for a lawyer's clerk, but he found work on Edward Stirling's sheep and cattle station at Lake Alexandrina. He found later work at Langhorne's Creek with Carter Potts, then experienced wheat farming in Strathalbyn, which entailed trialling Ridley's first header. By 1856 his parents and siblings had migrated to the colony, and he joined them in Adelaide, finding employment in the legal office of Matthew Smith, then with Hanson & Hicks. Then an opportunity arose for Benham to advance in the legal profession by taking his articles with James Huggins in Kapunda. In 1860 he married Elizabeth Wood, daughter of Rev. William Wood of Penwortham. They had a son Frank in 1861. On 21 June 1864, just a few days before his final examinations, his wife died. On 26 June 1864 he was admitted a practitioner of the Supreme Court of South Australia, and was taken into partnership with Huggins. In April 1867 he married again, to Amie Huggins, eldest daughter of his partner; they had around twelve children, of whom eight survived to adulthood.

Ellen was educated privately, then at the Advanced School for Girls before taking the science course at the University of Adelaide, graduating BSc with honours in 1892. She taught science at the Christ Church Anglican school in Kapunda for a short time before taking a study tour of England and Europe. She took an assistant position at Dryburgh School, then taught at Tormore House School for a little over twelve years. During this time she travelled to England, where she earned her Oxford Diploma of Education. After the death of Professor Tate she taught botany at the University of Adelaide and was appointed lecturer pro tem while awaiting the arrival of Professor Osborn Thus she was, under similar circumstances to Ada Mary Lambert at Melbourne University, the first woman appointed to an academic post at the university.

In December 1912, she purchased Walford School, Fisher Street, Malvern, from Lydia Adamson, its founder in 1893. She reformed its teaching methods and course content, notably introducing science to the curriculum. In 1917 she sold the school to Mabel Jewell Baker, who then led the school for almost 40 years.

== Recognition ==
In 1922 the Ellen Benham Scholarship was established at Walford in recognition of her contribution to the development of the school. The Benham Wing, which incorporated science classrooms, in what became the Walford Church of England Girls' Grammar School, was also named for her.

She was a co-founder and longtime supporter of Adelaide University's Women's Students' Society, and its president for several years.

Benham Street, in the Canberra suburb of Chisholm, is named in her honour.
