= W. Moxon Cook =

Australian sports journalist

William Moxon Cook (18 June 1857 – 20 December 1917) invariably known as Moxon or W. Moxon Cook, was an Australian sports journalist who wrote as "Trumpator" for the Register and "Terlinga" for The Australasian.

== History ==
Cook was born at "Ladywood", near Modbury, South Australia, the eldest son of William Cook (c. 1815 – 18 November 1897), who arrived in SA aboard Rajasthan in 1837, and in 1855 married Janet Whitehead MacNee (c. 1836 – December 1915), a daughter of Dr. John MacNee. They were a talented and literate family: Moxon's sister Edith Agnes Cook (1859–1942) was in 1876 the first female student at the University of Adelaide, and second principal of the Advanced School for Girls, and later, as Edith Agnes Hübbe, ran her own school. Katherine Dixon Cook (1874–1960) was a well-known musician and pianoforte teacher.

Cook was a prize-winning student at J. L. Young's Adelaide Educational Institution and early showed a love of sport, especially cricket, at which he displayed considerable ability. On leaving school began working for The Register, where his uncle John Howard Clark was editor. He left to work for the Central Roads Board, but the journalistic streak had not left him: from 1877 he contributed to his old employer occasional pieces on horse racing under the pen-name "Trumpator". In 1880, the sporting editor D. M. Magill retired, and Cook was appointed his replacement. He continued to write as "Trumpator", not only on the turf, but other sports as well. He had a deep understanding of the subject and wrote fearlessly but with such charm that he seldom ran into difficulties. His stories of the early days of South Australian racing were always interesting.

In September 1892 he left Adelaide for Melbourne to replace E. S. Chapman, "Augur", as sporting editor of The Australasian, which had a reputation for sports writing second to none. He was treated to special farewells by the newspaper staff, by the Adelaide Savage Club, of which he was a member, and by a host of friends at his old watering-hole, the Globe Hotel on Rundle Street, at which Sir Richard Baker (then Chairman of the S.A.J.C.) presided. W. B. Carr, a longtime collaborator, took his place at the Register, under the byline "Tarquin".

He served The Australasian for twenty five years, where his qualities of good sportsmanship, keen observation, and impartial criticism won for him a host of followers.

He possessed in a remarkable degree that journalistic quality whose first interest is in the events of the day. He had a fine memory, and his long experience mellowed his style, and gave a great charm to his writing; but he utilised the fund of reminiscences on nearly every occasion to illumine the subject of the hour, and not to exalt the past at the expense of the present. ... He was as frank in writing as in conversation. What he saw he chronicled with shrewdness and judgment, that which escaped him in the rapidly moving picture he assimilated from his surroundings ... He was a man of striking personality, and his tall and upright figure, his slow gait, were as well known at Randwick or Morphettville as at Flemington or Caulfield.

Other interests were card playing and billiards, at which he excelled, and bowls, at which he was a keen player. He was a longstanding member of Melbourne's Yorick Club, and until his last illness would often be seen there. One of his last pieces for The Australasian, written in what he knew were his last days, was a remembrance of James Wilson, written in the reminiscent vein that made his writing so attractive.

He died at his home, Orrong road, Elsternwick of cancer, which several operations had failed to halt. His funeral, held at the Brighton Cemetery, was well attended.

== Family ==
(William) Moxon Cook married (Susan) Beatrice Woodville (c. 1869 – 10 August 1951) on 20 July 1893. Their only child Elaine "Snowy" Cook (18 May 1894 – ) married Rupert Scott of Launceston, Tasmania on 19 July 1921.
