= Patience Hawker =

Australian teacher (1900 – 1994)

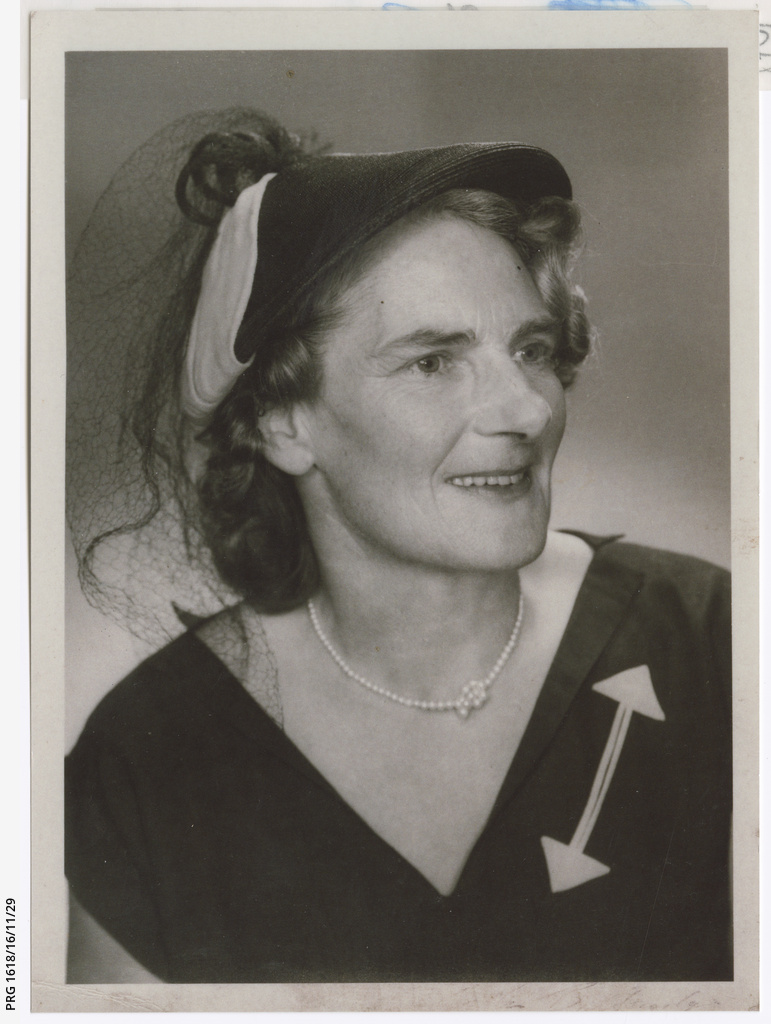

Patience Hawker (28 March 1900 – 9 August 1994) was a teacher who with Mabel Hardy co-founded Stawell School for girls in South Australia.

== History ==
Patience Constance Joan Hawker was a granddaughter of George Charles Hawker (1818–1895) and Elizabeth "Bessie" Hawker née Seymour (–1901), and daughter of Edward William Hawker MHA (1850–1940) and Mary Letitia Hawker née Stawell (1870–1938). The family had a property and residence at East Bungaree, where they were closely associated with the Wachenappee people. Patience was educated at home, then boarded at Yoothamurra school in Glenelg, followed by the Geelong Grammar School, then Frensham School at Mittagong, New South Wales.

She gained her BA at Bedford College, University of London, then returned to the family home "Wachenappee" in Stirling, near the Mount Lofty Railway station (later named "Olivet House"). In 1925, she was employed at Woodlands Girls Grammar School in Glenelg, South Australia, where she found a friend in second mistress Mabel Hardy, with whom she shared ideas about teaching. But she was not happy with the rather spartan staff accommodation and after a discussion with headmistress Dora Gillam left at the end of the year. She served for a few months at Girton School, then received a note from Mabel Hardy, who was enjoying a year in England and on the Continent, proposing a partnership to found a girls' school in the Adelaide Hills.

Fired with enthusiasm, Patience purchased "Arthur's Seat" a large bungalow on 90 acres (36 ha) near the summit of Mount Lofty and overlooking the Adelaide Plains. It was largely financed with a loan from her mother, and the school was named in her honour, she having been born Mary Stawell. A company, Stawell School Ltd., was incorporated on 21 December 1926 with Patience Hawker as managing director. The two women made the mansion their residence, with rooms for boarders, and had classrooms built away from the residence. They modelled Stawell School on her happy memories of Frensham, which had so inspired Patience. Part of their philosophy of teaching was Helen Parkhurst's Dalton system which gives the student a great deal of control over her own work, where the teacher is a resource and adviser rather than a lecturer, and students are encouraged to aid one another's learning.

Patience was not to remain long at Stawell School. She married (Charles) Roy Howard (1891 – 17 August 1935), a grandson of W. R. Cave, at Bungaree on 19 September 1928. They settled in a house on Charlick Road, some 3 km south-west of the School, and henceforth she had little to do with teaching or day-to-day decisions, though she retained the title and responsibilities of managing director. They had two daughters, Lucinda (1929–) and Virginia (1 October 1931 –). In 1935 her husband died of pneumonia and she sold their Crafers property and returned with her two children to East Bungaree, where she lived with her brother and father. Her daughters attended Stawell School until 1940, when it closed, and were enrolled at Girton. After her father died she returned to the city, purchasing a house in Kensington.

She joined the Labor Party and stood for the seat of Burnside at the 1946 by-election and for the Legislative Council (the first woman contender) in the 1953 election, Central No.2 but was unsuccessful on both occasions. She was a member of the Adelaide Lyceum Club and a keen bridge player. She helped found the Norwood branch of Meals on Wheels and worked with that organisation for some thirty years. She maintained a close relationship with her daughters and, later, grandchildren. She changed houses one more time, to Rosslyn Park.

== Sources ==
- Barbara Wall A Short History of Stawell School: The forgotten school on Mount Lofty published for Mount Lofty Districts Historical Society by Peacock Publications 2012 ISBN 978-1-921601-69-9
