= League of the Empire =

British patriotic organisation

League of the Empire, often referred to as "League of Empire" was a British organisation established in 1901 with branches throughout the British Empire, with the aim of inculcating patriotic feelings. It was successful in inaugurating Empire Day, on 24 May, prior to 1901 celebrated as the Queen's Birthday. The object of the league was stated as

"... to inspire personal and active interest in the Empire as a whole, and to promote educational and friendly intercommunication between its different parts (1) through the teaching of Imperial history and conditions by means of public and school lectures; (2) through the furtherance of such training as shall make members efficient citizens in whatever part of the Empire they may be called upon to live; and (3) through the supplying to the youth of the Empire a common bond of literary intercourse by means of a magazine, or by means of written correspondence, member with member, or school with school."

== History ==
By 1904 there were 70 branches in Great Britain.

== Branches ==
=== Australia ===
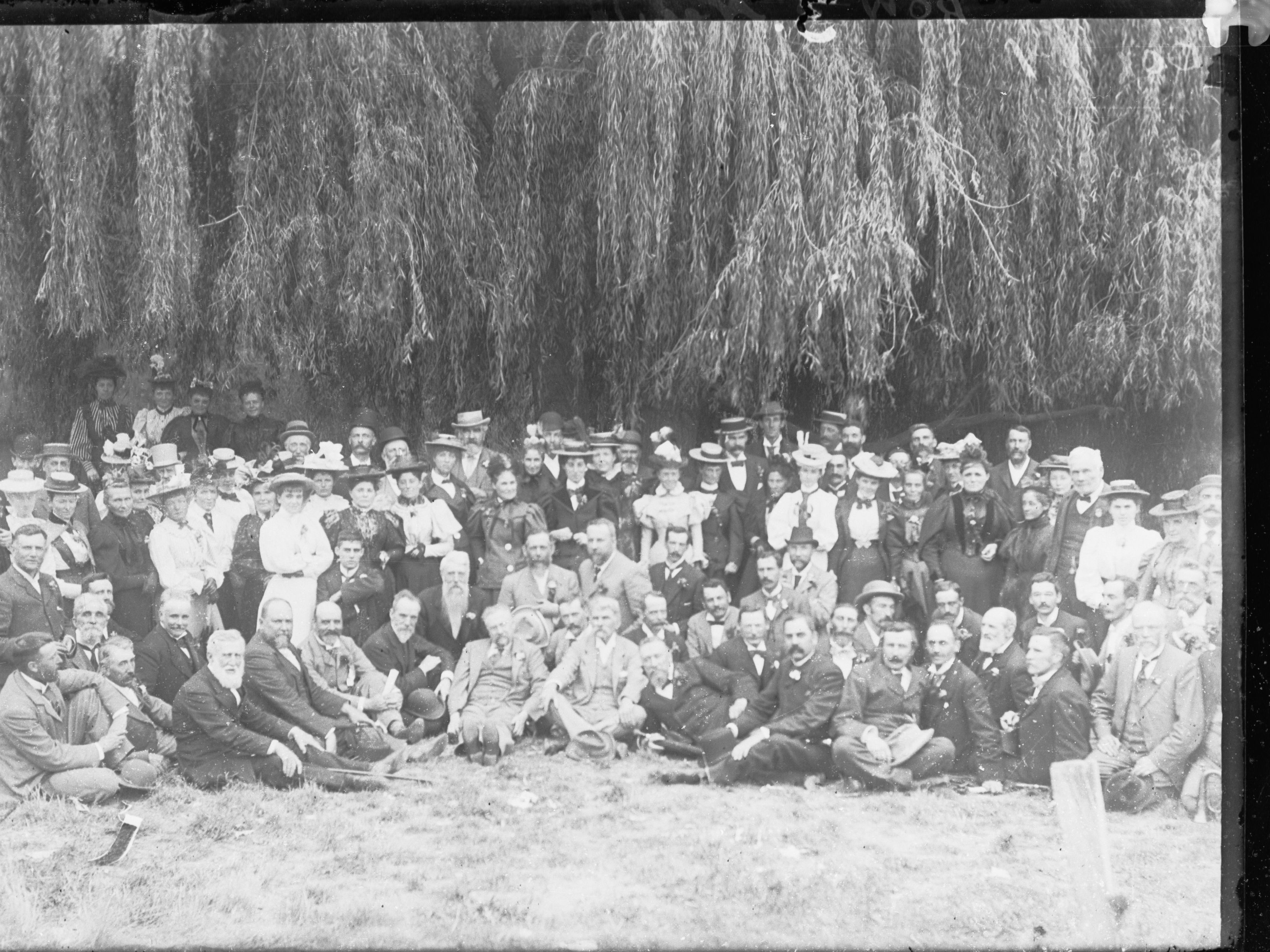
League of the Empire in Australia (date unknown)

The South Australian branch, which may have been the only branch in Australia, was founded in 1904 with president Samuel Way, and secretary M. Rees Ward. The Governor, (Sir George Le Hunte), was Patron. Meetings were held at the Advanced School for Girls on Grote Street, later at Our Boys' Institute on Wakefield Street, Adelaide. The League was prominent at the wreath laying ceremony at the statue of Queen Victoria on Victoria Square, Adelaide each May 24 (or 23rd if the 24th was a Saturday), and participated in many Empire-related activities until the early 1950s, by which time newspaper reports were confined to its membership in the Council of Empire Societies, and after 1954 had disappeared altogether.

=== Canada ===
Mrs. Elizabeth Middleton Ordmarshall, C.B.E., sometime secretary of the League, represented the League in the Dominion of Canada for six months in 1910. She went on to found the Imperial Union of Teachers in 1913, and died on 29 March 1931.
