= Frederic Chapple =

Headmaster of Prince Alfred College in Adelaide, South Australia (1876-1914)

Frederic Chapple CMG (12 October 1845 – 29 February 1924) was the headmaster of Prince Alfred College in Adelaide, South Australia, from 1876 to 1914.

== History ==
Frederic was born in London. His parents were John Chapple, a mason from Devonshire, and his wife Louisa, née Brewin. Though Presbyterians, they sent their son to a Wesleyan Methodist day school because of its good reputation. As well as reaching high academic standards he entered whole-heartedly into the religious life of the school and church, and at age 18 was assessed first among applicants for a scholarship to Westminster Training College. He sailed through the course, consistently coming top of his class, while maintaining his church activities – holding simultaneously the positions of poor steward, church steward, circuit steward, and Sunday school teacher and superintendent.

At the end of his course he was appointed locum tenens head of the teaching schools run by the college, and in the evening studied for the London University BA at King's College and University College, Cambridge. In 1870 he was appointed to a permanent position with Westminster Wesleyan Methodist College, teaching science and mathematics. He completed a course at the South Kensington Science School, and was awarded a BSc by the London University. He was convinced of the need for biblical teaching in secular as well as church schools; he was a founding member of the National Union of Elementary Teachers, which he represented in 1870 at a congress on the desirability of religious teaching in government schools.

=== Prince Alfred College ===
The principal of Prince Alfred College, John Anderson Hartley, BA, BSc (1844–1896), resigned late in 1875 after only five years as head, to take a position as Inspector-General of State Schools. Rev. Drs Alfred Rigg (1832–1891) and James Egan Moulton (c. 1841–1909) were commissioned by the Prince Alfred College Committee to find his replacement, and after some hesitation Chapple accepted their invitation, and arrived with his family in Adelaide on 8 April 1876. He joined the Kent Town Church the next day, and occupied the same pew for the next 32 years.

He reduced the high importance the school had previously placed on Classical languages – Latin and Greek – and greatly increased the stress on English, mathematics and sciences, but maintained the close linkage of the school with the Methodist Church. He was an attractive and forceful speaker, and impressed on his students the value of thorough preparation before mounting the platform, and clear English and careful diction when delivering a speech.

Chapple placed equal importance on a healthy body – he brought to the school a new emphasis on physical fitness, and ensured the school's gymnastic and sporting equipment was kept up-to-date, and encouraged a sense of pride in the school's sporting achievements, notably in competition with St Peter's College ("Reds" v. "Blues"). He was a strict disciplinarian but cheerful with it, and an inspiration to his students, who universally remembered their old head, nicknamed "Jingles" or "Conk", fondly. He was a keen cricketer and in the early days played for the school team.

He was highly effective in raising the public profile and status of the school, and consequently its ability to raise building funds from parents as fees, and from past students as bequests.

He retired in November 1914 and was of course obliged to vacate the headmaster's residence. He purchased a house on The Parade, Norwood, South Australia, which he and his wife shared with their unmarried daughter, Dr Phoebe Chapple. He maintained an interest in a variety of spheres until he was severely injured by falling down stairs at the Adelaide YMCA, which forced him to relinquish most of his activities. He died at Norwood, and was buried in the West Terrace Cemetery.

== Other interests ==
- He was invited to join the Senate of the Adelaide University in May 1877, and was its warden for 40 years. He was also for 23 years a member of the University Council.
- He was President of the Collegiate Schools Association, and Vice-President of the Teachers' Guild.
- He was a foundation member and a trustee of Adelaide YMCA.
- He was first President of Our Boys' Institute, which office he held for five years (and was Vice-President up to the time of his death).
- He was the second President of the Council of Churches, and was also one of the Methodist representatives on that body for many years.
- He was a President of the South Australian Literary Societies' Union, and elected a life member of that organization
- He was also connected with the Royal Society.
- He loved cricket, and was also a keen tennis player, a longtime member of the Kensington club, one of Adelaide's first four tennis clubs (with Parkside, Semaphore and Glen Osmond).

He did not often travel outside Australia: only in 1901, when he was a delegate to the Methodist Ecumenical Conference and 1920, when he took holidays in conjunction with a commission to represent the Council of Churches, both in Britain. He had intended another trip to visit his son Harold, an obstetric and gynaecological surgeon at Guy's Hospital, in February 1915, but World War I intervened.

== Family ==
Frederic Chapple (1845–1924) married schoolmistress Elizabeth Sarah Hunter (c. 1845 – 19 October 1930) in Bethnal Green, England on 16 April 1870. Their children included:

- Edith Chapple (1872–1937) married Joseph Auburn Haslam on 1 December 1900. She was involved with Our Girls' Institute, YWCA and Council of Churches; after the death of her husband she lived with sister Phoebe. Her daughter Margaret (1911– ) also qualified as a medical doctor, married Dr Frank Magarey in 1938.
- Frederic John Chapple, BSc, MB., ChB (1872–1948) married Mary Alice Fletcher ( –1944) on 13 May 1902. None of his family was present and there was no notice in the Adelaide newspapers. She was a daughter of Brisbane auctioneer Charles Fletcher. He was medical superintendent at Rockhampton General Hospital, then Brisbane General Hospital, then Adelaide Hospital 1904– , later had a private practice in Glen Osmond.
- Marian Chapple, BA. (1874–1930) married Rev. Rowland Broadbent on 14 March 1911
- Alfred Chapple, BSc. (1876– between 1930 and 1948) married Hannah Melville Simmonds on 24 July 1907. He and Lawrence Birks won the Angas Engineering Scholarships in 1893.
- Gertrude "Gertie" Chapple (1878– 27 May 1947) attended the Advanced School, but was noted more as a singer and violinist than a scholar. She married Frederick Waldeck on 6 September 1902 and moved to Dongarra, Western Australia. They had four sons. They divorced in 1923 and she reverted her surname to Chapple, taught music and singing, and worked with the Band of Hope, living at 26, The Parade, Norwood. Rev. Edwin E. C. Waldeck was a son.
- Dr Phoebe Chapple, BSc, MB., BS (1879–1967) was a noted medical doctor.
- Dr Harold Chapple, BSc (1881–1945) married Irene Briscoe Arbuthnot-Lane on 12 September 1911. She was a daughter of Sir William Arbuthnot-Lane; he was a Harley Street specialist.
- Ernest "Ernie" Chapple, BSc (1882–1940) married Kathleen Muriel "Kath" Cadell of Dubbo on 15 July 1933. He studied at the School of Mines and Adelaide University, where he was first to qualify in electrical engineering; worked for James Martin & Co of Gawler, and the Sulphide Company at Broken Hill, gaining further qualifications at Cambridge before becoming manager of a rubber company in Burma. He was a fine athlete and lacrosse player.

Six of the eight were awarded degrees at the University of Adelaide and several earned higher degrees at Cambridge or the University of London (not shown in the above list). Daughter Phoebe was one of the first women doctors to serve at the front during WWI; she was awarded the Military Medal in December 1918.

== Recognition ==
- He was offered, but refused, an appointment as principal of a Wesleyan university in Illinois, USA.
- He was made a Companion of the Order of St Michael and St George in the 1915 New Year Honours list.
- On his retirement in January 1914, the boys presented him with an illuminated address which read:
  Our Dear Head Master— In making this presentation, the boys of Prince Alfred College wish to show their deep appreciation of the great and noble work you have accomplished during your long term of 39 years as head master. To you the many boys who have passed through this college owe a debt which they can never repay, but for which they hold you. in love, honour, and highest esteem. Under your able direction and guidance the school has attained its present position, and it is the ambition of every boy, past and present, to do his best to keep up the honour of the old school, for which you have laboured so long. It is our earnest prayer that both you and Mrs Chapple may long be spared to enjoy your well-earned rest.
- A bronze bust of the headmaster, executed by Gustave A. Barnes of the Adelaide National Art Gallery, was in 1917 commissioned by the old scholars of P.A.C., and is prominently displayed at the college.
- A later headmaster, J. F. Ward, said of Chapple that he was "the man who really founded Prince Alfred College as a great school".
