= Mabel Hardy =

Mabel Hardy may refer to:

- Mabel Hardy (badminton) (1879-1947), English badminton player
- Mabel Hardy (educator) (1890-1977), Australian educator
