= F. W. Dancker =

South Australian architect (1852–1936)

Fredrick William Dancker (1852–1936) was a South Australian architect, best known for villas in the wealthier suburbs of Adelaide. He founded the firm of F. W. Dancker & Son (1880–1944).

== History ==
Danker was the third child and eldest son of Henry Dancker and Jane Pratt Dancker of Macclesfield, South Australia, who married in 1850. He was educated at a private school in Aldinga, and a school in England, where he studied naval architecture, but found no avenues for employment in Australian shipyards. He therefore studied architecture in Melbourne, then returned to Adelaide and was articled to Daniel Garlick. He spent much of his early professional life at Broken Hill. He established an architectural business in 1880 and worked alone until taking on his son Eric as an articled student. They formed a partnership "F. W. Dancker and Son" in 1913. He continued to practise until he retired in 1931, following an accident. His son continued in the business until 1953, when he died.

Dancker aimed to design attractive practical buildings, with attention to attractive combinations of brick and stone, and often included elaborate verandahs and rooflines with crenellations and turrets, often on a grand scale. Notable home designs include "Adare" (1893) at Victor Harbor for the Cudmore family, and "Attunga" (1900) for the Burford family.

Non-residential works include:

- Creche in Gouger Street, which critics likened to a doll's house
- Our Boys Institute, Adelaide (1896)
- Institute at Macclesfield
- Maternity hospital, which was renamed Queen Victoria Hospital at Rose Park (1902)
- St Paul's Lutheran Church, Hahndorf
- Methodist Church at Malvern (became Uniting Church)
- Rectory at Mount Barker, South Australia

== Publications ==
- Modern Dwellings: 100 selected designs (1904), aimed at educating the general public.

== Personal ==
Dancker married Clara Ann Phillipps on 10 May 1883. Their children include:

- Eric Phillipps Dancker, known as E. Phillipps Dancker, (1889–1953) was an architect
- Gladys Clara Dancker

He died at his home on 26 August 1936.
