= Mrs Henry A. Doudy =

Australian educator, temperance worker and author

Jane Sarah "Jeanie" Doudy, née Stanes (28 September 1846 – 16 August 1932), was an Australian teacher and author who, as Mrs Henry A. Doudy wrote The Magic of Dawn, a popular historical novel based on an incident in the life of Captain Charles Sturt.

== History ==
Stanes was born in London, the only daughter of Henry James Stanes (c. 1819 – 24 July 1877), son of Henry Bowes Stanes, merchant, of Madeira, and Annie Stanes (c. 1812 – December 1883). They arrived in Adelaide aboard the barque Caspar, H. Eldred master, on 10 September 1849, and settled in Kermode Street, North Adelaide. They had at least two sons: Edgar William Stanes in 1853 and Arthur Minchin Stanes (c. 1857 – 29 February 1880). Both were prominent athletes and proficient cricketers. A possible third son Henry James Stanes (c. 1848–1928), also a prominent cricketer, married Mary Robson Davis (died 1922) in 1874. He was a builder, living in Norwood, and in 1879 left South Australia for Beverley, Western Australia.

Stanes was a teacher at East Adelaide school (later Grote Street Model School) in 1878, and in 1879 was appointed the first headmistress of the Advanced School for Girls. She married Henry Alfred Doudy (1849 – 24 August 1931) on 25 June 1881.

H. A. Doudy was a police officer in the South-East for many years, then in 1898 gained appointment as a stock inspector, stationed in the Far North. He transferred to Mount Barker where he was still working when he retired.

While her husband was stationed in the South-East (12 years at Kingston and two at Naracoorte), Doudy was a prolific writer on temperance issues to The Border Watch and other newspapers. She produced energetic pamphlets on temperance and social purity for the WCTU and the White Cross movement.

They moved to Port Lincoln to be near their only child, Cecil Roy Doudy LLB. (11 August 1882 – 12 October 1955), who had a home "The Terraces", and was a popular citizen and active sportsman.

Doudy died at Port Lincoln. She is remembered for two novels:

=== Growing Towards the Light ===
It was hailed as "one of the best books on the subject of temperance yet published." and the Sydney Morning Herald found "a good deal of general didacticism; but if this does not frighten away the reader, he will find a closely knit story mostly with an Adelaide setting."

Growing Towards the Light won first prize at the "Australian Exhibition of Women's Work", held in Melbourne in 1908, while still in manuscript form. It was subsequently published by George Robertson. She won that prize again in 1914, with her thesis The Higher Education of Women in which she contends "higher education for women is not under discussion. It has come, and has come to stay. What we want to consider is the manner in which it is likely to be of benefit to the human race as a whole."

=== The Magic of Dawn ===
This story of the George Gawler Charles Sturt voyage of discovery up the River Murray is told in the first person as "Elsie Hamilton", one of three women on board, the others being Julia, the real-life daughter of Governor Gawler, and Sturt's wife Charlotte.

The actual voyage took place from December to December 1838; when the real-life third woman was Eliza Arbuckle, who as "Eliza Davies" published her autobiography The Story of an Earnest Life in Cincinnati, Ohio, in 1881.
Arbuckle was born c. 1819 in Paisley, Scotland, and emigrated to Sydney aboard Portland, Capt. Coubro, in 1838 in company of Mr and Mrs Holmes. She sailed to Adelaide aboard John Pirie, Capt. Murray, in company of Mr and Mrs Sturt, arriving March 1839 after a long voyage.
Captain Sturt's report of the trip was reported in several Adelaide papers.

Newspaper reviews of the book were complimentary, treating it as a realistic portrayal, and noting its close relation to historical events.

One factual error in the book was picked up by A. T. Saunders, who doubted Sturt and Eyre ever explored together. In a graceful reply, Doudy acknowledged this assertion, but insisted they were great friends and respected each other's work. Eyre learned much from Sturt's professionalism, and Sturt named his daughter Charlotte Eyre in tribute. Saunders made a mistake himself, making Julia the Governor's sister, rather than his daughter.

A radio dramatization of the story, read by Beryl Alford, was broadcast in serial form over ABC national and regional stations in 1939.

== See also ==
Other writers of popular Australian histories:

- George Blaikie
- Frank Clune
- Ion Idriess
- Ian Mudie
- Cyril Pearl
