= Ulrich Hübbe =

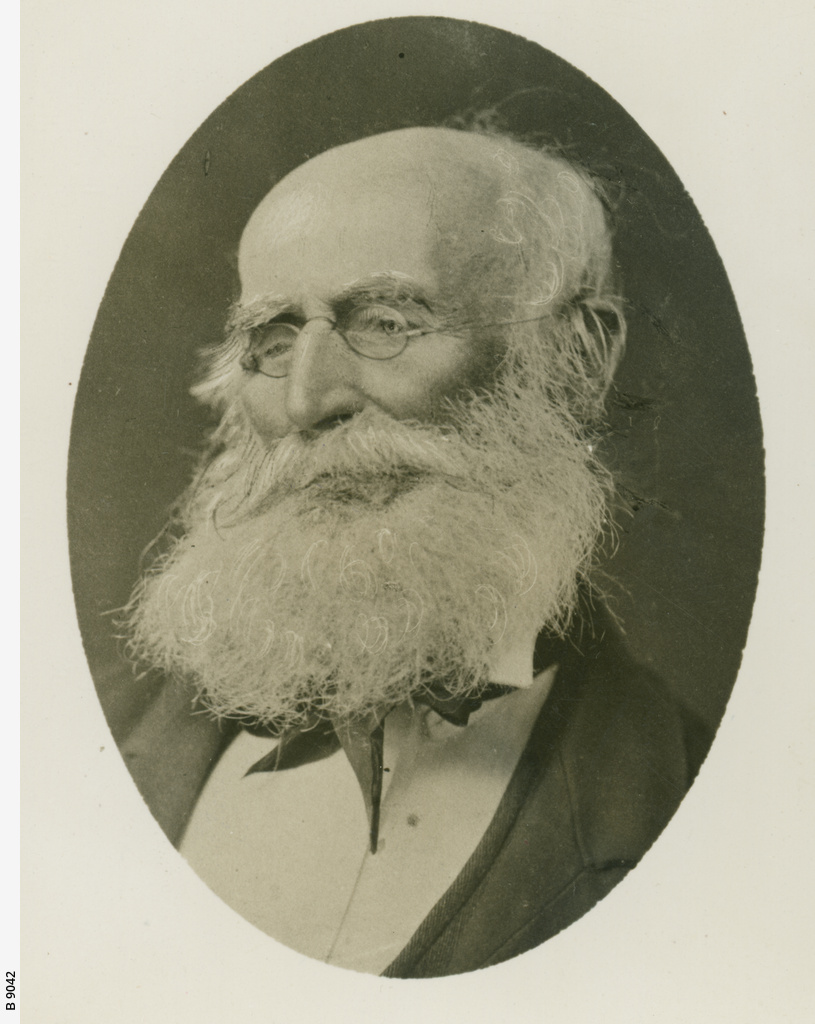
- Hübbe, circa 1880
- Born: June 1, 1805; Hamburg, Holy Roman Empire
- Died: February 9, 1892 (aged 85); Mount Barker, South Australia
- Known for: Torrens land title system

Ulrich Hübbe LL.D. (1 June 1805 – 9 February 1892) was a German immigrant to South Australia, remembered for his part in framing the Real Property Act, which led to the Torrens title system of land registration.

== History ==
Dr. Hübbe was born in Hamburg in 1805, the third son of Heinrich Hübbe (1771–1847), and was educated at the Johanneum Gymnasium before studying law at Jena, Berlin, and the University of Kiel (then in Denmark), where he was awarded his LL.D.

He arrived in South Australia aboard the Taglioni, 350 tons, from London in October 1842, and for a time worked for the South Australian Register before being involved as a land agent.

The system of land title deeds which existed from the foundation of South Australia, as inherited from the Britain, was complex, open to abuse and disliked by both land agents and landowners, and seemed to have few supporters apart from traditionalists and lawyers. Suggestions for centralized registration of property were made in the earliest days after Proclamation by such as James Hurtle Fisher. Dr. Hübbe, who had personal experience with both the German system and the British, was one among many who wrote to the papers suggesting reform, but it was not until R. R. Torrens submitted his "Real Property Act" to the House of Assembly that any substantial effort towards reform was made.

Hübbe, who was away from Adelaide around this time, returned in 1856 to find Torrens's campaign in full swing, and wrote, as "Sincerus", to The Register supporting the Act and making light of the difficulties in its implementation. Torrens, who was under siege from some powerful interests, sought out Hübbe as an ally, no doubt with an eye to enlisting the support of the equally powerful German community. In support of Torrens's campaign, Hübbe wrote a booklet The Voice of Reason and History on Conveyancing, drawing on his knowledge of European law, particularly that inherited from Hanseatic League States, but also of France. The cost of printing and publishing was met by G. F. Angas.

Responding to commentators who claimed he was the unacknowledged father of the Real Property Act, Hübbe wrote:

... I modestly disclaim as a matter of fact the honour of having originated that Act, ... (although) I drew attention to the very objectionable features of the English mode of conveyancing, and to the honest, unsophisticated mode of transfer practised in Germany. ... The facts pointed out and the ideas thus kindled in the minds of clear-sighted, practical men, who were afterwards seen in the front rank of the contest, were no doubt farther circulated, ... Torrens first laid down his scheme of legal reform, formed his private committee; and prepared the public mind for the contemplated change by a series of telling articles in the public journals. Of all this I knew nothing, nor was I at that period known to Mr. Torrens; and on returning to Adelaide in 1856 I was perfectly surprised on finding the reform campaign in full operation, and the papers bristling with leading articles and letters on the subject, and the men of law on the heights of indignation — not then from any great apprehension of danger, but at the unprecedented boldness and comprehensiveness of Torrens' assault. Well may you say that his is a "master-mind." He perfectly understood the situation. He brought, besides his own intellectual powers, tact, and brilliant eloquence, the landowners, large and small, the commercial men. the tradesmen, and the intelligence of the South Australian people as a whole, to bear on the subject all at once, so as almost to overwhelm the opponents of reform. Perceiving, however, that he was likely to be outflanked by adroit opponents on some intricate points of permanent consequence both in the foundation and practical working of the new system, I ran, unasked by Mr. Torrens and unknown to him, into the breach. My letters signed ' Sincerus ' arrested Mr. Torrens' attention directly. He came to look for me in my humble abode in Freeman-street, and we have ever since been firmly allied. I and other Germans, led on by Beyer, Vosz, and many others, gave him what ever assistance we were able to contribute; and he, finding me well up in the judicial and historical aspects of the matter, encouraged me to write ' The Voice of Reason and History on Conveyancing' (not yet wholly forgotten), and he got Mr. G. F. Angas, in his own generous way, to bear the whole costs of publishing. I also lent Mr. Torrens some amount of industrious and persevering aid in privately discussing the principles of his first scheme, and I had a share — a very humble share — in re-settling the draft of the first Act before its second reading. I claim, therefore, no more than a share in this useful work, in which I have been — and am proud that I have been— an aider and abettor; but, as you will now see, I have not been its originator. ... it were unjust to Sir Robert Torrens to withhold a single leaf of the crown of laurel which belongs to him, and to him alone, as the originator of his great Act. But if, under present circumstances (he being absent), my fellow-colonists will allow me to advise them they will find me a thoroughly sound and expert, as well as firm, defender of the Act. Yours, &c., ULRICH HUBBE. L.L.D. [sic]

Ulrich and his wife lived with their teacher daughter Isabella from around 1875; at Spalding, then at White Hut. He was a deeply religious man of the Lutheran faith, and was blind for many years before his death, but having taught himself to read Moon type (an alternative to Braille) was able to console himself by reading the Gospels and Psalms. In the House of Assembly, in September 1884, E. W. Hawker moved, seconded by J. L. Stirling, that Hübbe be granted £200 in recognition of his contribution, given gratuitously, to Torrens's Act. One commentator called him "one of the most unselfish, un-businesslike, and gentle creatures that ever lived", and hoped that he would be better appreciated in an after-life.

== Family ==
Ulrich Hübbe married Martha Gray ( – 29 July 1885) in 1847.

- Martha Mary Hübbe (1 August 1848 – 27 January 1881) married John Hood (c. 1839 – 15 May 1924) in 1871. Both worked at Townsend Duryea's photographic studio.
- Samuel Grau "Sam" Hübbe (1 August 1848 – c. 15 October 1900) married Edith Agnes Cook (1859 – 2 April 1942) on 3 January 1885. He was Inspector of Vermin, then the first commissioned officer to be killed in the Boer War. Edith Agnes Hübbe established Kingsbridge School with her sister Harriet(t) Ann Cook in 1885.

- Dr Edith Ulrica "Rica" Hübbe (1885–1967), was a student at ASG. She taught at Kingsbridge School while earning a BA (with honours) in Classical Literature, and a BM., BS. by part-time study. After Kingsbridge School closed in 1922 she practiced medicine and taught at the University of Adelaide.
- Janet Doris Hübbe (1887 – 17 December 1950) married Alfred Allen Simpson (15 April 1875 – 27 November 1939) on 6 January 1910.
- Sgt Max Ulrich Hübbe (28 May 1891 – ) of 1st AIF, then farmer at Woodenup, near Kojonup, Western Australia
- (Harriet) Marjorie Hübbe (1893 – 1993) taught at her mother's Kingsbridge School, before marrying Alfred Beech Caw ( – 1966) on 22 February 1922, farmed at Woodenup.
- Capt. (Hermann) Fritz Hübbe (1895 – 28 July 1916) joined the 1st AIF, was killed in action, in France.

- Catharine Elizabeth Hübbe (1851–1861)
- Isabella Christina Hübbe (c. January 1854 – 18 October 1946) was a teacher at Spalding from 1877, and White Hut from 1880, married Francis Coleman May (1855 – 26 February 1923) in 1889, lived at "Uplands", Mount Barker, moved to Mullewa, Western Australia in 1908.
