= Ellen (1883 ship) =

1883 trawler and shipwreck, South Australia

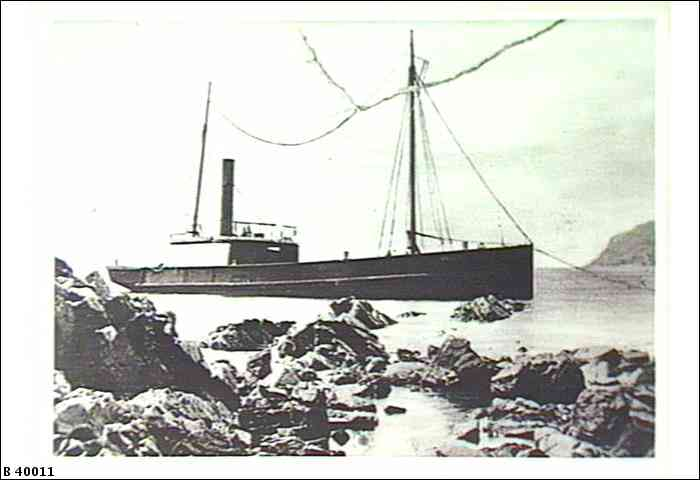
- The trawler Ellen wrecked on Morgan Beach (State Library of South Australia image B40011)

History
- Name: Ellen
- Owner: Breslin and Watson
- Builder: Smith Forrester & Co., Queensland
- Completed: 1883
- Fate: Sold
- Notes: Iron hull
- Name: Ellen
- Owner: Messrs. W. R. Cave & Co.
- Port of registry: Port Adelaide
- Acquired: Prior to 1908
- Fate: Wrecked, Morgan’s Beach, SA 1908

General characteristics
- Class & type: Twin screw steamer
- Tonnage: 91 tons (Gross), 62 tons (Net)
- Length: 100 feet (30 m)
- Beam: 18 feet 6 inches (5.64 m)
- Depth: 6 feet 6 inches (1.98 m)
- Installed power: steam, twin 30 horsepower, 11 inch cylinders.
- Propulsion: engine, sail
- Sail plan: schooner rig
- Speed: 8 knots

Ellen (also known as SS Ellen) was a steamship that was launched in 1883 and whose career involved coastal shipping firstly in the Colony of Queensland and then in the Australian state of South Australia. It was wrecked in Gulf St Vincent in South Australia at Morgan's Beach near the town of Cape Jervis on Saturday, 12 December 1908 during its return from fishing in waters around Kangaroo Island to a destination on the mainland.

== History of vessel prior to loss ==
Ellen was built in Brisbane, Queensland in 1883 for Messrs. Breslin and Watson for the purpose of trade from Gladstone to Keppel Bay and other ports within Queensland.

The ship purchased several years prior to 1908 for the purpose of 'coastal work' in South Australian waters by Messrs. W. R. Cave and Co. and Co., grain merchants, shipping and Customs agents based at Port Adelaide.

== Historical account of loss ==
The vessel was chartered in November 1908 for 3 months by a delegation of Scottish fishermen consisting of Messrs. W. J. Newlands, W. Eaglesham, W. Grieve and M Grieve, and who were interested in establishing a fishing business in South Australia.

On Thursday, 10 December 1908, Ellen under the command of Captain A. McMillan departed from Glenelg for Kangaroo Island with Mr Newlands, and a crew of 6.

On Saturday, 12 December 1908, Ellen returned from Hog Bay on Kangaroo Island en route to a destination on the mainland with a load of fish valued at £50. Ellen encountered very rough conditions when passing Cape Jervis. The rough conditions included a sudden swing in wind direction from the South West to the North West. As a result, the ship drifted astern towards the shore until its stern run aground on the rocky seabed. The bow was then swung around onto the rocks by the waves thereby completing the wrecking. The heavy sea then continued to pound the wrecked vessel, washing fittings and timber overboard and onto the shore. The crew escaped to shore via the use of a dinghy while Mr Newlands swam to the shore.

At its meeting on Wednesday, 30 December 1908 the Marine Board of South Australia found that the wrecking was caused by the inability of the ship to regain control after the sudden change in wind direction because of its insufficient engine power.

== Aftermath ==
Despite the wrecking event and the complete loss incurred, the Scottish fishermen resolved to continue with their enterprise.

In 1962, the wreck site was extensively salvaged by divers visiting from New South Wales.

The Society for Underwater Historical Research (SUHR) carried out a survey of the site in 2003. The SUHR study reveals that the principal feature of the wreck site at the time was a boiler sitting in the intertidal zone. The wreck site is protected by the SA Historic Shipwrecks Act 1981 and is located at 35°35′46.5″S 138°06′07.6″E.

== See also ==
- List of shipwrecks of Australia
- List of shipwrecks in 1908

== Further Information ==
The online collection of the State Library of South Australia includes the following images of the ship after its grounding:

- 'The SS Ellen wrecked near Cape Jervis, South Australia, 1909' at http://images.slsa.sa.gov.au/searcy/43/PRG280_1_43_72.htm, retrieved 20 June 2012.
- 'Distant view of the SS Ellen wrecked near Cape Jervis in South Australia, 1909,’ at http://images.slsa.sa.gov.au/searcy/43/PRG280_1_43_73.htm, retrieved 20 June 2012.
