= Mabel Jewell Baker =

Australian headmistress

Mabel Jewell Baker OBE (30 December 1885 – 17 June 1967) was a South Australian headmistress.

== Early life ==
Baker was born on 30 December 1885 in East Adelaide. She was the third of nine children of William Kendall Baker and Harriett Ann (née Chaston). Baker attended East Adelaide School, then the Advanced School for Girls in Adelaide. From 1904 to 1906, Baker was a pupil-teacher at Parkside and Walkerville public schools before she went on to attend the University Training College in 1907–08. Baker went on to teach at Payneham Public School for four years. Starting in 1907 and for six years she passed nine arts subjects at the University of Adelaide where she also was part of the Women Students' Club. In 1907, Baker protested salary inequality.

== Career ==
In 1913, Baker began to teach history, geography and English at Walford Girls School in Malvern before she was promoted to senior mistress soon after; a role in which she began in 1917 after the death of then senior mistress Ellen Benham. In 1917, Baker moved the Walford Girls School to its present location in Hyde Park. She started the Old Scholar's Association soon after her promotion and move of the school. Baker, due to her Anglican connexion, was welcoming to students who belonged of all faiths and denominations. She was noted for creating a strict yet friendly environment at the school.

Baker was an original member of the Adelaide Lyceum Club. In 1924 she founded the Association of Headmistresses of Girls Secondary Schools of South Australia; she served as president twice (in 1943 and 1954).

Baker's choice of staff helped improve the academic reputation at Walford in contrast to the scarce science facilities which got the short end of the stick. Moreover, it wasn't until 1941 that secretarial classes began at Walford. In 1937 Baker worked for the Adelaide conference of the New Education Fellowship before inaugurating the Walford Parent-Teacher Association a year later. Baker allowed people at her school to express pacifist views during World War II despite her being a royalist and a patriot. From 1943 to 1955, Baker was an Educational Broadcasts advisory committee member before her six-year stint on the Soldiers' Children committee. Baker sold her 450 pupil school to the Anglican Church and she retired in late 1955. In 1956, Baker was appointed O.B.E and she was a councillor of University Women's College (later St Ann's College) until 1961.

== Personal life and death ==
In 1920, Baker's mother allowed boarders to stay on a property that she owned in Hyde Park, known as ‘Woodlyn’ and 16 years later Baker's whole school moved to that property. Baker's sister Amy ('Miss Dob') also was a teacher and a bursar and Baker's sister Florence ('Miss Flo') was in charge of the boarding house. After her retirement, Baker lived with her sister Amy.

On 17 June 1967 Baker died at Westbourne Park and she was buried in North Road cemetery. She was commemorated by a school history in 1968. The Baker building and the Mabel Jewell Baker scholarships at Walford Anglican School were named in her honour.
