= Agnes L. Storrie =

Australian poet, novelist and journalist

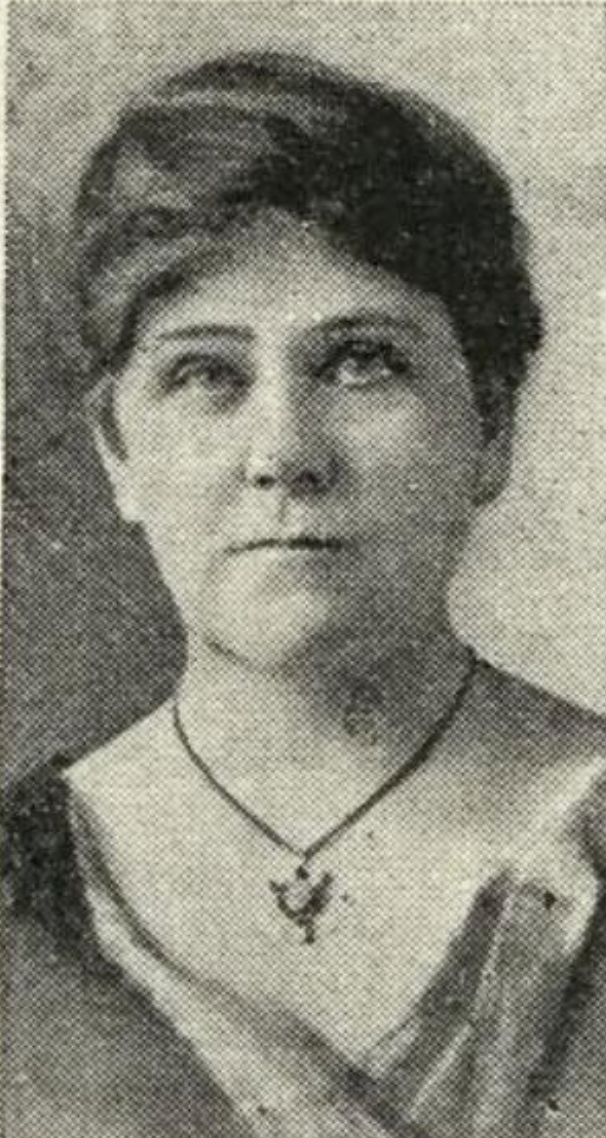
- Storrie in 1916
- Born: Agnes Louisa Storrie; 23 August 1864; Glenelg, Glenelg, South Australia
- Died: 20 August 1936 (aged 71); Woolwich, New South Wales, Australia
- Occupations: Poet; writer
- Writing career
- Pen name: Agnes L. Kettlewell; A.L.S.; Senga; "AYEA"; La Pensee; Inky Fingers
- Notable work: Poems (1909)

Agnes Louisa Storrie (23 August 1864 – 20 August 1936) was an Australian poet, writer and one of the founders of the Wattle Day League. She wrote as Agnes L. Storrie, but was also known by her married name, Agnes L. Kettlewell. Other pennames included A.L.S., Senga, "AYEA", La Pensee and Inky Fingers.

== Life and writing ==
Agnes Louise Storrie was born in Glenelg, South Australia on 23 August 1864. She was the third daughter of James and Agnes Storrie (née Tassie). She was educated at the Advanced School for Girls in Adelaide.

Storrie was an associate member of the Glenelg Literary Association. Her poem "What the overseer told me" was award second prize by the South Australian’s Literary Societies' Union in September 1887. In the same competition her "Grapes From a Thorn" won first prize for a novelette and was subsequently published in the Adelaide Observer.

On 10 July 1890 Storrie married John Wilson Kettlewell at the Congregational Church in Glenelg. Following her marriage she moved to Sydney, home of her husband.

A volume of her poetry, titled Poems, was first published in Sydney in 1899. A review in The Sydney Morning Herald referred to it as a "small volume of pretty verse", while the Adelaide Advertiser's critic said "all express deep feeling, and show an exalted view of the poet's calling". A review published in 1912 said that "Agnes L. Storrie has a wonderful knowledge of our own country, and the lonesome out-back."

In 1899 she and her husband edited the Tourist guide to China, Japan, islands and ports en route, Australia and Tasmania for the Eastern and Australian Steamship Co., Ltd.

Two of her poems, "Twenty Gallons of Sleep" and "A Confession", were included in Bertram Stevens’ Anthology of Australia Verse, published by Angus & Robertson in 1906.

Marion Miller Knowles wrote an article, "Australian Women of Note", for the Advocate in 1922. She said that Storrie's "poems in a mystic vein are as musical as an infant's lullaby".

== Wattle Day League ==
In 1909 Storrie was one of the founders of the Wattle Day League, along with the NSW Government Botanist, Joseph Maiden and Hannah E. Clunies-Ross. The movement sought to celebrate Wattle Day as Australia’s national flower and raise patriotic feeling. She was appointed honorary secretary at the inaugural meeting on 30 August. Storrie resigned from that position in 1919, having promoted the concept in London as well as across Australia.

== Personal ==
Storrie's only son, John Bryan Kettlewell, died on 11 February 1922 at Griffith, New South Wales aged 19. Her husband, a retired publishers' representative, predeceased her on 22 February 1933.

Storrie died on 20 August 1936. The following day her funeral left her residence at 16 Point Road, Woolwich for the Northern Suburbs Crematorium. She was survived by her two unmarried daughters, Rhoda Storrie Kettlewell and Joyce Kettlewell, who were both journalists.
