= Madeline Rees George =

Teacher, headmistress (1851–1931)

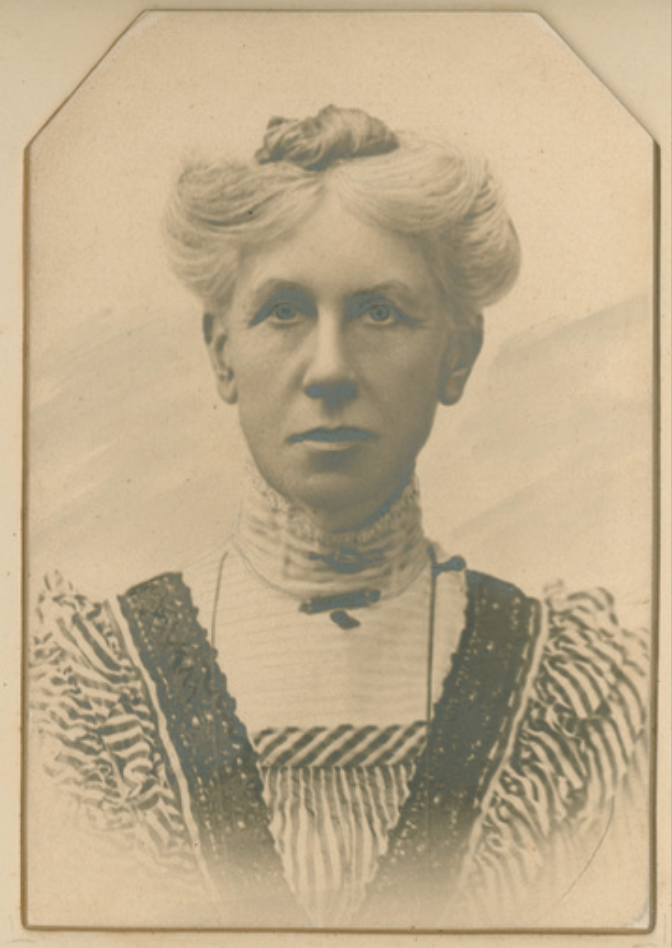
- Madeline Rees George
- Born: 25 May 1851; Lewisham, Kent
- Died: 17 June 1931 (aged 80); North Adelaide, South Australia
- Occupation: Teacher
- Known for: Headmistress, Advanced School for Girls and Adelaide Girls' High School

Madeline Rees George (25 May 1851 — 17 June 1931), often written M. Rees George, was a teacher in Germany and in Adelaide, South Australia. She was at various times proprietor of her own school, and headmistress of the Advanced School for Girls and Adelaide Girls' High School.

Her sister, Marian Rees George (c. 1855 – 23 July 1938), taught French at the same institutions and retired in 1936.

== Early life and education ==
Madeline Rees George was born on 25 May 1851 in Lewisham, Kent, a daughter of Francis George, a London solicitor. She was educated in England and Germany.

== Career ==
George had teaching experience at Kissingen, Wiesbaden, and Munich and came to Australia in 1879. She joined the South Australian Education Department in 1880 as the foundation teacher of languages (German in particular) in the Advanced School for Girls. In 1885, she resigned to conduct a school of her own at North Adelaide ("Miss Woolcock's school"), but in 1886 was invited to return to the department as headmistress of the Advanced School. She held this post until 1908, when the school was merged into the Adelaide Girls' High School, and she was made headmistress of the new institution, in the same Grote Street.

She resigned from the department in 1913.

George made trips to England in 1900 and 1907, when she went as a delegate to the first League of the Empire conference held in London, and again in 1913.

== Personal life and death ==
George never married.

She died on 25 May 1851 in North Adelaide, aged 80.

== Other activities ==
George was in 1904 one of the founders and first secretary of the Adelaide branch of the League of the Empire. One of the greatest ambitions in her life was to raise £300 through the League of the Empire to enable the statue of Charles Sturt to be erected in Adelaide.

== Family ==
Marian Rees George (c. 1855 – 23 July 1938) was her sister and French mistress at both the Advanced School and Adelaide High. She lived at Childers Street, North Adelaide.

Another sister, Ella "Nellie" Rees George (c. 1853 – 31 May 1948), married John Holland Robertson on 22 January 1878. He, with his brothers Robert and William owned Calperum and Chowilla stations. They were neighbours and friends of the Cudmore family.
