= Edith Agnes Cook =

Australian educator (1859–1942)

Edith Agnes Cook (1859 – 2 April 1942), was in 1876 the first female student at the University of Adelaide, and second principal of the Advanced School for Girls in Adelaide, South Australia. She was later, as Edith Agnes Hübbe, principal of her own school in Knightsbridge, now Leabrook.

== History ==
William Cook (c. 1815 – 18 November 1897) arrived in SA aboard Rajasthan in 1837; on 1 January 1855 married Janet Whitehead MacNee (c. 1836 – December 1915) on 1 January 1855. They were pioneers of Pinnaroo, where William and Wilton Hack had established a sheep run, but were forced off it by the drought of 1865–1867; they moved to Kensington and Golden Grove, then from 1874 to 1884 managed the "Government Farm" (later to become Belair National Park).

Cook was born in 1859 near Campbelltown, South Australia; she was educated at Miss Martin's School, conducted by Annie Montgomerie Martin. By 1875 she was a pupil teacher at the Grote Street Model School; in 1877 she was the school's second assistant; and promoted to first assistant the following year. Around this time she was studying at the University of Adelaide: Latin under Professor Lamb, botany under Professor Tate, and Physiology under Professor Stirling. In 1879 she was seconded to the about-to-be-opened Advanced School for Girls in Franklin Street as deputy to Jane Stanes. Stanes retired at the end of 1880, and Edith was appointed her successor, though a Government regulation, stipulating that a head of a school must be aged 25, had to be waived by the Minister of Education J. Langdon Parsons. While head of the school she frequently invited Catherine Helen Spence to address the students.

She married "Sam" Hübbe ( –1900) in January 1885 and late that year she resigned from ASG, to be replaced by Madeline Rees George (c. 1851–1931). Edith's sister Harriet(t) Ann Cook (born 1855) had in 1885 founded Knightsbridge School, a co-educational school in a house owned by Euphemia Clark (Mrs. M. Symonds Clark) on The Parkway, Leabrook, and in 1886 moved the school to Edith's home in Statenborough Street, Leabrook, which the two conducted jointly, and shortly purchased a nearby house which served the school until 1921, when they retired. The school had a high reputation: Dorothea Forster "Dorrit" Black (a grand-daughter of John Howard Clark) and Dora Crompton (Mrs E. W. Harris), both recipients of the Tennyson medal for English; Maurice Giles (Mayor of Westminster), Bill Hayward, Dr. Darcy Cowan and Gladys Rosalind Cowan (Mrs. Essington Lewis) were among their successful students.

== Family ==
William Cook (c. 1815 – 18 November 1897) arrived in SA aboard Rajasthan in 1837. He married Janet Whitehead MacNee (c. 1836 – December 1915) on 1 January 1855. Janet's sister Agnes Macnee (c. 1843 – 13 June 1913) was John Howard Clark's second wife.

- Harriet Anne Cook (c. 1855 – November 1943) governess for H. C. Swan, founded Knightsbridge School (1886–1921) with sister Edith Agnes Hübbe. Harriet wrote Harriet wrote Reminiscences of Life on the Government Farm 1874–1884 (1942) manuscript donated to Archives Department 1943; copies held by the University of Adelaide; Old Government House, Belair National Park.
- (William) Moxon Cook (18 June 1857 – 20 December 1917), educated at AEI and SPC, as "Trumpator" he was sporting editor of South Australian Register, then as "Terlinga" with The Australasian. Longtime member of Yorick Club.
- Edith Agnes Cook (1859 – 2 April 1942) married Samuel Grau "Sam" Hübbe (c. 1848 – 12 September 1900) on 3 January 1885. He was the first South Australian commissioned officer to be killed in the Boer War. A practising Unitarian, he was a son of Ulrich Hübbe, who was largely responsible for the Torrens Title system of land registration.

- Dr Edith Ulrica "Rica" Hübbe (10 October 1885 – 1967), was a student at the Advanced School for Girls.
- Janet Doris Hübbe (1887–1950) married (Alfred) Allen Simpson (1875–1939) on 6 January 1910. He was a son of Alfred M. Simpson
- Sgt Max Ulrich Hübbe (28 May 1891 – ) of 1st AIF, then farmer at Woodenup, near Kojonup, Western Australia
- (Harriet) Marjorie Hübbe (1893–1993) married Alfred Beech Caw ( – 1966) on 22 February 1922, farmed at Woodenup.
- Capt.(Hermann) Fritz Hübbe (1895 – 28 July 1916) of 1st AIF, was killed in action, France.

- George Dowell Cook (c. 1861 – 24 September 1912), clerk of the Probate Court, died as the result of a bicycle accident.
- Mary Rankine Cook (1868 – ) married Frederick Henry Bathurst (1859 – 2 May 1929) in 1892. He was finance writer "Minos" of The Mail, later a member of Sydney Stock Exchange, founded Mining Standard then finance editor for Melbourne Argus.
- Katherine Dixon Cook (8 October 1874 – 1960) was a well-known musician and teacher of pianoforte. She studied under Gotthold Reimann and taught at ASG for a few years until amalgamation with Adelaide High School, when music was dropped from the curriculum.
- Henry Alfred "Harry" Cook (c. 1886 – 10 December 1966) married Dorothy Owen (c. 1888 – 20 June 1963); he was manager of National Bank, retired to Barmera
