= Daniel Cudmore (businessman) =

Australian pastoralist

Daniel Michael Paul Cudmore (1811 – 3 November 1891) was a pastoralist in the early days of the colony of South Australia, and the founder of a family highly influential in that and other states, especially Queensland.

== Early life ==
Daniel Michael Paul Cudmore was born in Tory Hall in County Limerick, Ireland in 1811 and educated in Essex, England.

== Emigration ==
In 1835 he and his wife Mary (née Nihill), together with his wife's immediate family, emigrated to Australia on the John Denniston under Captain Mackie which left Liverpool on 11 February 1835 for Sydney, Australia and arrived in Hobart, Van Diemen's Land, on 7 June 1835. His original destination may have been Sydney, but while the ship was in Hobart, he met a cousin, surgeon Captain Russell of the 63rd Regiment, who persuaded him to settle in Van Diemen's Land (later Tasmania). Cudmore found employment as a schoolmaster, then at Peter DeGraves' (1878 – 31 December 1852) Cascade Brewery at The Cascades in Hobart.

A year later they received news of the Proclamation of South Australia, and he chartered a yacht and with a cargo of supplies headed for the new colony, arriving at Holdfast Bay early in 1837, Mary following in the Siren, on which yacht their second child, James Francis, was born.

== Business interests and properties ==
Cudmore was a partner in the Adelaide Union Brewing Company, located opposite the office of the Southern Australian on Rundle Street in 1838. In August 1843 he took out a wine and beer licence for the "Harp Inn" (later "Harp of Tara") on North East Road, near Dry Creek. In the early 1840s he built a substantial brewery and a malt factory off Melbourne Street, North Adelaide, which perhaps became the Lion Brewing and Malting Company.

In 1847 the news came that he had inherited a considerable property, "Manister", in County Limerick, Ireland from Jane Cudmore (c.1803 – 7 May 1847), a cousin. He arranged for it to be sold and with the proceeds purchased pastoral properties in the mid-north of South Australia: Yongala, Pinda, and Beautiful Valley (situated between Mount Remarkable and Port Augusta Stations). He also purchased the Paringa cattle station. He left management of these properties to his sons and went to Queensland.

He took up a station on the Clarke River, a tributary of the Burdekin River, and purchased 4,000 acres (1,600 ha) on the Herbert River, near Cardwell for a sugar plantation. In 1871 he purchased Avoca Station, at the junction of the Murray and Darling Rivers in New South Wales, and in 1876 added the adjoining Popiltah Station, making a total leasehold of 900,000 acres (360,000 ha) and freehold of 33,000 acres (13,000 ha) near Wentworth.

His sons Daniel Henry, Milo Robert, and Arthur Frederick together ran Avoca and Popiltah stations in New South Wales, Oakvale in South Australia, and Boondoon in Queensland, as Cudmore Brothers. In 1895 Daniel Henry left the partnership to take over Boondoon.

== Personal life and homes ==
Daniel was a strong swimmer, and saved several people from drowning.

He wrote several poems, published under the title Poetical Scraps.

In 1862 he bought "Hartley Bank", near Glen Osmond, built in 1848 by Alfred Hardy, (Note: Hardy, a brother of Arthur Hardy, married Mary Louisa Newenham, the daughter of C. B. Newenham (first sheriff of SA); their children included solicitor C. B. Hardy, Mrs. T. W. Corbin, Dr. James Hardy, and Mr. G. N. Hardy.) one of Colonel Light's survey team. He renamed it "Claremont" and immediately set about enlarging it.

In 1889, Cudmore bought a property and dwelling near Victor Harbor, South Australia formerly owned by the son of the Governor of South Australia, John Hindmarsh and then his son. Cudmore had the house rebuilt to a grand dwelling to plans by architect F. W. Dancker, complete with three turrets. The property, known as Adare House, has been in the hands of the Uniting Church since the second half of the 20th century.

== Family ==
Cudmore married Mary Nihill in 1835, at home "Claremont," Glen Osmond. Among their children were:

- James Francis (11 October 1837–17 August 1912)
- Margaret Cudmore (15 July 1842–9 December 1871)
- Daniel Henry Cashell "Dan" Cudmore (7 February 1844–14 December 1913)
- Milo Robert Cudmore (1852–12 July 1913)
- Arthur Frederick (17 December 1854–19 August 1919)

== Sources ==
- Ritchie, Elsie For the Love of the Land: The history of the Cudmore family published by the author, Sydney, 2000. ISBN 0 9585368 3 X
- P. A. Howell, 'Cudmore, James Francis (1837–1912)', Australian Dictionary of Biography, National Centre of Biography, Australian National University, accessed 11 June 2013. (Shared entry with Daniel Henry Cudmore)
- P. A. Howell, 'Cudmore, Sir Collier Robert (1885–1971)', Australian Dictionary of Biography, National Centre of Biography, Australian National University, accessed 11 June 2013.
- Margaret Steven, 'Niall, James Mansfield (1860–1941)', Australian Dictionary of Biography, National Centre of Biography, Australian National University, accessed 11 June 2013.
