= St Paul's Lutheran Church, Hahndorf =

Lutheran church in Hahndorf, South Australia

Coordinates: 35°02′02″S 138°48′50″E

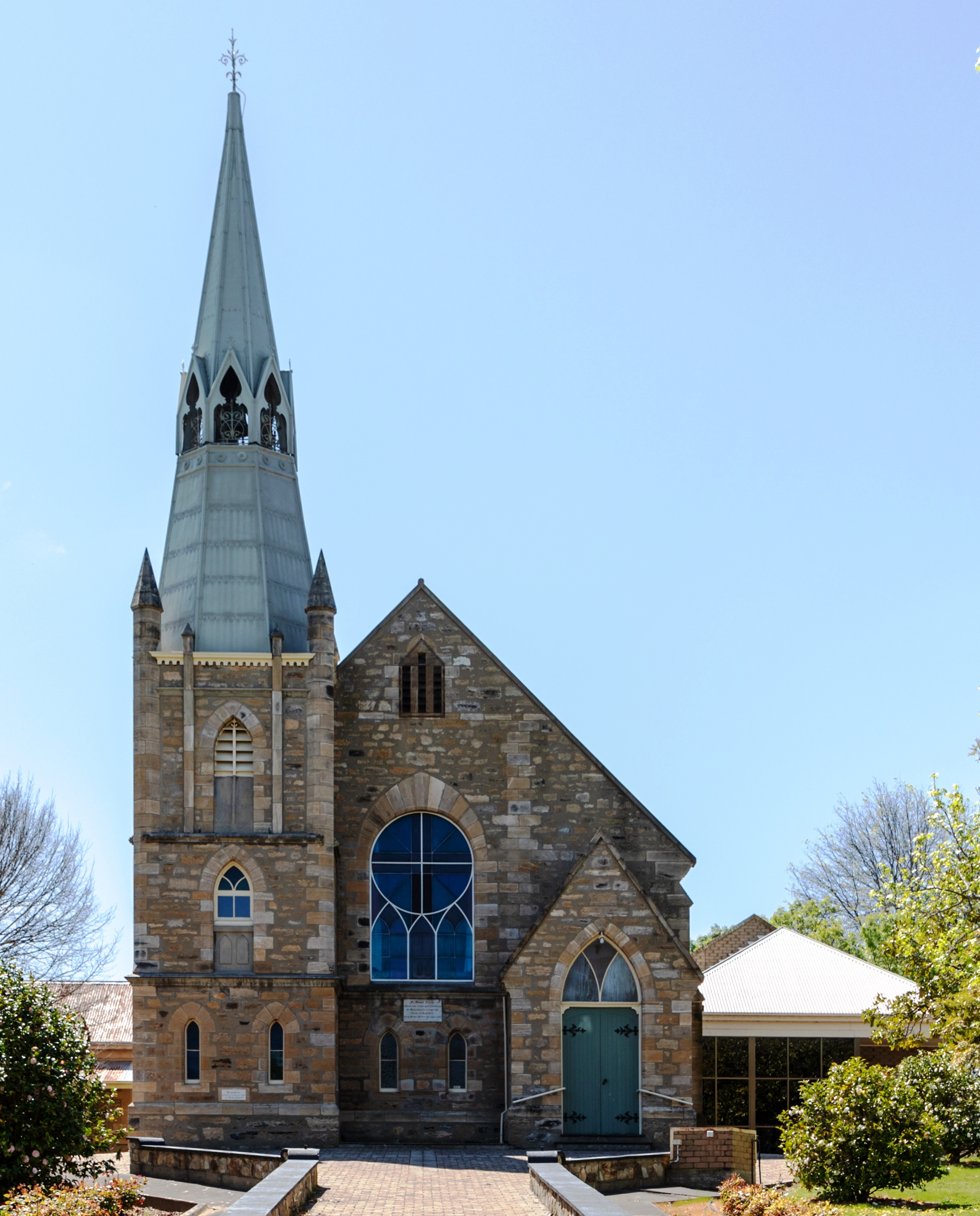
St Paul's Lutheran Church in 2019

St Paul's is a Lutheran church in Hahndorf, South Australia, one of two rival Lutheran communities in that township. It is not to be confused with the Anglican Church of St Paul in Hahndorf, which opened in 1886.

== History ==
The original St Paul's Lutheran Church of Handorf was built on Windsor Avenue, Hahndorf, and its foundation stone was laid December 1858. Adelbert Fiedler (Note: The spelling "Adalbert" is also common, notably in the German-language papers, but his name is signed "Adelbert" in a letter to Adelaider Deutsche Zeitung.) was pastor at the time, but the date of his inauguration has not been found. Fiedler, who was also associated with the Evangelical Lutheran congregation of the Dreifaltigkeits Kirche (Trinity Church) in Angas Street, Adelaide, returned to Germany in 1874.

The first church in Hahndorf, St Michael's, had its origin in one founded in 1839 by Pastor Kavel; their first chapel was a rudimentary pug and pine affair built in 1840. Pastor Gotthard Daniel Fritzsche broke away from Kavel with his followers, few in number but growing to become the majority, and with support of the Supreme Court took over the church. Fritzsche also ministered to the congregation of Lobethal. (Lobethal was briefly [1917–1935] renamed Tweedvale; Hahndorf was Ambleside over a similar period.)

St Paul's Evangelical Lutheran Church of Lobethal was founded in 1853 by a breakaway group under Fiedler, ostensibly reacting to Fritzsche's stand against dancing, although some reacted against Fritzsche's espousal of Millennialism.

In 1889 the church decided on a new building; the stone was laid on 8 January 1890, and the chapel was opened on 14 September 1890, pastor Rev. John Peter Niquet of St Stephen's, Adelaide conducting the ceremony. The architect was F. W. Dancker and the builder was D. Both of Eudunda. The bell was made by Kuhnel of Germany. A powerful Estey organ was installed. A marble slab affixed to the front read "St Paul's Church. Built to celebrate the establishment of the Evangelical Lutheran Church in Hahndorf by Pastor Kavel in 1840."

== Pastors ==
Several pastors competed with St Michael's church for the attention of Hahndorf citizens, though none was as well organised as St Paul's congregation, under Pastor C. F. Braun.

- 1846–1860 August Ludwig Christian Kavel (1798–1860) started an alternative Lutheran congregation when Fritzsche took over St Michael's in 1846. He lived at Klemzig but also had responsibilities at Bethany, Langmeil etc. Langmeil was recommended by Johannes Menge and Flaxman bought 28,000 acres in the Barossa, with Angas's money.
- Kappler arrived by the ship Victoria in 1848 and started a third congregation at Hahndorf. His "Free Protestant Church" is discussed by Brauer, along with the possibility of a confusion of similar surnames. He may be the person who was installed as a minister to the Melbourne Lutheran church in 1853.
- 1860–1864 (Gustav) Adolf Staudenmayer, previously a colleague of Keppler (Note: The identity of this Keppler has not been found. It may be a typo for "Kappler", later of Victoria, but of whom little more is known, but more information is needed.) and Rieschieck and opponent of J. Christian Auricht and the Immanuel synod.
- 1858–1874 Adelbert Fiedler. During his incumbency a merger was formed between his congregation and Kappler. When Fiedler returned to Germany he exhorted his congregation to merge with that of Strempel. This lasted weeks or years before they split to form St Paul's.
- 1880–1885 Ludwig Erdmann Kuss (c. 1859–1940)

Pastor C. F. Braun and the Immanuel Synod

- 1884–1938 (Carl) Friedrich Braun (Note: C. F. Braun has elsewhere been referred to as F. Braun, so was presumably known as Friedrich.) (6 February 1857 – 3 June 1941) was assistant to Pastor Reusch of Tanunda before accepting a call to St Paul's of Hahndorf and St Paul's of Lobethal (founded 1859), as well as several others further north. In 1890 he accepted the Blyth charge as well, relinquishing the northern stations. He may be the parson referred to as T. Braun at the opening of the new church. He was a member of Hahndorf Liedertafel. He was in Germany at the outbreak of war and evicted as a British citizen. He was six years president of the General Synod and helped bring about the Lutheran Union in 1921. Braun was chairman of the Immanuel synod

- St Paul's church was erected 1890

- 1938–1950 Werner Erich Petering. He made the news earlier: in a libel suit brought by one Hermann Adolf Heinrich, ex-teacher at Hermannsburg Mission.
- 1950– Carl Julius Pfitzner (1906–2001) subject of the book John Clement Pfitzner (2006). Sowing the Seed: Reminiscences of Carl Julius Pfitzner Farmer and Pastor 1906–2001. Seaview Press. ISBN 1740083989. by his son, John Pfitzner (1942–2013).
