= Pamela Wall =

Australian billionaire philanthropist

Pamela Wall AO OAM
- Born: Pamela Maunsell Hogon
- Education: St Peter's Woodlands Grammar School
- Occupation: Philanthropist
- Known for: Contributions to education, arts, and community development
- Spouse: Ian Wall (deceased)

Pamela Wall is an Australian philanthropist known for major contributions to education, the arts, and community development in South Australia. She is the largest individual shareholder in Codan Limited, a technology company co-founded by her late husband, Ian Wall.

The only child of a bank manager, she spent her childhood in various regional towns across South Australia before attending boarding school from the age of ten. She was educated at St Peter's Woodlands Grammar School, later becoming one of its most significant benefactors with the establishment of the Dr Pamela Wall Centre for Sport and Performing Arts, and initially trained as a nurse.

== Business interests ==
Wall is the largest individual shareholder of Codan Limited, holding approximately 19.2% of the company as of 2025. Her late husband, Ian Wall, was one of the original co-founders of the company in 1959.

== Philanthropy and donations ==
Wall's philanthropy has focused on expanding access to education, supporting the arts, and funding community development projects.

In 2023, she donated A$5 million to the University of Adelaide to establish the Ian & Pamela Wall Chair in Electrical and Electronic Engineering, along with funding research fellowships.

In August 2024, she made a significant donation to St Peter's Woodlands Grammar School—where she was formerly educated—to support the construction of a major multi-purpose sports and performing arts centre. The facility will be named the Dr Pamela Wall Centre in recognition of her contribution.

In December 2024, it was reported that she had donated A$10 million to the Adelaide Festival Centre through the Ian & Pamela Wall Performing Arts Initiative, marking one of the largest individual philanthropic gifts in the centre's history.

Wall donated $5.2 million to the South Australian Liberal Party in 2024–25.

== Honours ==
In 2007, Wall was awarded the Medal of the Order of Australia (OAM). She was later appointed an Officer of the Order of Australia (AO) for distinguished service to the community through philanthropic support for a range of cultural, educational, and health organisations.
