= W. R. Cave =

Australian businessman (1842–1916)

William Rendall Cave (17 June 1842 – 6 July 1916) was a grain merchant and shipowner in the early days of South Australia.

He was a son of Charles Cave (died 1851) of Stoke-sub-Hamdon, South Somerset, and Susannah (1800 – 19 December 1862) who came to Adelaide in 1848 or 1849 and settled at Gumeracha. William found employment with John McKinlay at his cattle station at Lake Victoria, New South Wales. Next the Chambers brothers gave him a job at their northernmost cattle property, Beltana Station, and he remained there for several years, becoming an expert bushman.

He broke in most of the horses used by John McDouall Stuart's 1861 expedition across the continent to Port Darwin. He and John Chambers shod all their horses, and Cave made duplicate sets of horseshoes, possibly at Chambers' Bobmoonie Station where the explorers made their final base before pushing into the unknown. Despite his peripheral association with the Stuart expedition, he was prominent in the many jubilees held between 1883 and 1914.

Early on he went to Port Adelaide and took up stevedoring work for William Younghusband, loading the Solway with the first full cargo of wheat from South Australia for London (perhaps in May 1862), and the Thomas Brown for Acraman, Main, Lindsay, & Co. But after six months on the wharfs he secured a position as overseer of "Thursk", a cattle station near Overland Corner belonging to John White, where he was associated with Sir Jenkin Coles.

== In business ==
After a year at "Thursk" he returned to the Port, working as a shipping and customs clerk with his brother-in-law, James Rawlings (1820 – 27 January 1896). From July 1867 they were trading as Rawlings & Cave, general shipping merchants.

In September 1873 Rawlings left the business, which continued to trade under that name until July 1874, but in October 1873 Cave founded W. R. Cave & Co., with offices at Port Adelaide and Grenfell Street, Adelaide. The business steadily expanded especially in the grain trade, with agencies throughout South Australia and branches in the other States. His partners were his son, John R. Cave, his nephew, Charles H. Warren and for a time Frederick Charles Howard. They became South Australian agents for Howard Smith and Co from ?? to 1893 and McIlwraith, McEacharn & Co. Around 1914 the city offices moved to Flinders Street. Rawlings went on to found the very successful shipping agents J. Rawlings & Son.

== Shipping ==
W. R. Cave & Co. owned or chartered a large number of undistinguished coasting vessels, and from 1889 to 1893 shared a wharf with the Howard Smith Company. Three vessels made the news: Gwydir, Ellen, and Simplon.

On 18 June 1901 the barge Gwydir sunk with the loss of three seamen while being towed, lightly loaded with wheat, from Port Pirie to Port Adelaide by the tug Eleanor. Both Gwydir and Eleanor belonged to W. R. Cave & Co., so William absented himself from the Board for its hearings. The Court of Enquiry found Captain William Tulloch of the Eleanor not guilty of neglect. Cave was criticised under parliamentary privilege, to which answered in the newspapers.

The Ellen (also known as the SS Ellen) was a coastal freighter and trawler, which was wrecked in Gulf St Vincent at Morgan's Beach near Cape Jervis, South Australia on Saturday, 12 December 1908.

He imported the trawler Simplon from England in 1909 with the intention of starting a trawl fishing industry in South Australian waters. In 1914 he lent her to the South Australian government for the relief of people suffering the effects of the economic depression which was underway at the time.

== Other activities ==
During the Boer War he was, with Sir Jenkin Coles and N. W. Stirling (1853–1916), involved in the selection and purchase of South Australian horses for the Bushmen's Corps and 4th Contingent in 1900. and with William Robertson. for the Fifth Contingent of 1901.

He discovered several fossils on the banks of the Warburton River, which he presented to the Port Adelaide Museum.

He was appointed a governor of St Peter's College in 1888.

He was a warden of the Marine Board from 1896 to 1901.

He was for many years a director of various marine insurance companies: Commercial Marine Insurance Company Pty., South British Fire and Marine Insurance Company of New Zealand and Imperial Fire Insurance Company, including periods as chairman and vice chairman. (There is a family connection here – from 1848 to December 1850 his father, Charles Cave, was vice-chairman of the Adelaide branch of Imperial Fire Insurance Company.)

He was appointed South Australian Consul for Chile (or "Chili" as it was then spelled) from 1903 to 1916.

Cave was a major sponsor of Joshua Ives' appointment as the University of Adelaide's first lecturer in music in 1885. It is also possible that he was a composer, as sheet music by a composer called W. R. Cave was published early in the 20th century. The National Library of Australia identifies the composer as William Rendell Cave (spelling the middle name's second vowel as an "e" rather than "a") (Due to a typing error in this library entry, the reference to his death year is inconclusive (given as "191")). Counter-evidence is the report in The Musical Times of 1 January 1891 of the performance of Mendelssohn's "Hymn of Praise" at the People's Palace, conducted by one W. R. Cave, and in the same journal of 1 September 1894, a book New Violin and Violoncello Music, with pieces by Gilbert R. Betjemann, J. W. Ivimey, W. R. Cave, ..., ..., etc.

== Family ==
William had a brother and six sisters who migrated to South Australia:

- John D(arby) Cave (c. 1822 – 20 October 1899) who married Helen James ( –1887) of Gumeracha on 28 November 1853 and was a prominent citizen of Greenock then Burra.
- Lucy Cave ( –1912) married George Warren (c. 1822 – 25 February 1895) of Gawler on 4 April 1855. George was brother of John Warren MLC.

- Charles H(erbert) Warren (17 January 1856 – 6 November 1917) married Alice Maria Downer (1862–1960). He was a partner in W. R. Cave & Co. and for a time its head. A daughter, Constance Jean Warren (1891–1977), married Sir Lavington Bonython on 11 December 1912. His second wife, she was appointed OBE in recognition of her many public activities.

- Sarah Cave (c. 1829 – 13 February 1903) married James Rawlings (c. 1820 – 27 January 1896) on 31 May 1854 James was head of J. Rawlings & Son, shipping agents.
- Mary Cave (c. 1831 – 20 October 1894) married David Thomas ( – before 1855) in 1849. She married again, to John Beaton Terrell (c. 1829 – 12 January 1873) on 20 January 1855.
- Martha Cave (c. 1833 – 5 December 1908) married Joseph Howard (died c. 28 March 1893) on 30 October 1851. They lived at Glenelg then Gawler on 4 November 1851.

- Frederick Charles Howard (c. 1856 – 20 April 1919) was a partner in W. R. Cave & Co. and later director of a number of companies, notably chairman of directors of the Broken Hill South mine.

- Annie Cave ( – 5 August 1900) married John Beavis Randell (1829 – 24 March 1876), brother of Captain Randell.
- Susan Cave ( – 1 June 1911) married William Clark (c. 1832 – 5 June 1907) of Angaston on 19 November 1856.

He married Barbara Grierson (1849 – 12 December 1896), daughter of Captain Thomas Grierson, on 18 April 1867. They had a residence at Woodville, then Semaphore from around 1874 to 1890, then 191 Brougham Place, North Adelaide. From 1884 they also had a summer residence "Pomona" at Mt. Lofty.

- (Ellen) May Cave (4 May 1868 – 8 October 1938) married Charles William Brebner (c. 1862 – 12 February 1945) on 10 April 1897. The solicitor Charles Cave Brebner was their son.
- Lucy Grierson Cave (3 August 1869 – 1950) married cousin Frederic Charles Howard on 3 February 1891. She was the owner of "Frimley", a mansion on Belair Road, Lower Mitcham.

- (Charles) Roy Howard (1891 – 17 August 1935) married Patience Constance Joan Hawker (28 March 1900 – 9 August 1995) on 19 September 1928. She was co-founder of Stawell School.

- Thomas Grierson "Tom" Cave (11 September 1870 – January 1886). Tom and his friend Alfred Muecke (son of H. C. E. Muecke) were drowned while holidaying at Chowilla, the station of a friend William Robertson.
- Annie Alma Cave (11 January 1872 – 25 December 1941) never married.
- Emily Marie Cave (11 June 1873 – 1957) married horse racing identity Charles Loftus Moorhouse (1872–1963) on 14 December 1901. Their son Thomas Kilner "Tom" Moorhouse (1905–1971) was also well known in racing circles.
- Hugo Charles Cave (18 May 1875 – 12 May 1944) married Ada May Bowman (died 12 March 1944) on 10 October 1904, lived at "Waverley", South Terrace (sold to the Adelaide Legacy Club, later consultants' rooms associated with St. Andrews Hospital). Their daughter Mary Cave (6 October 1915 – ) was a prominent socialite.
- John Rendall Cave (1 April 1877 – 1957) John was jailed for a year on a charge of murder, for helping procure an abortion for Antonie Helvig "Tony" Klemich, who died on 26 March 1908 of peritonitis. Mrs Lundberg, in whose care the infection occurred, refused to testify and was not charged. A similar death in 1904 was not mentioned in court. He married Elsie May Bissett (died 10 April 1937), living at St Peters and had a son on 2 May 1923. He later came to the attention of the police for failing to maintain his family and for not complying with a maintenance order. Her death notice mentions her parents but not husband.
- Edmund Howard Cave (1888–1962) married Ada Georgina Clare (17 August 1888 – 1966) on 16 August 1911, lived at Stirling West.
