= Caroline Jacob =

Australian schoolmistress

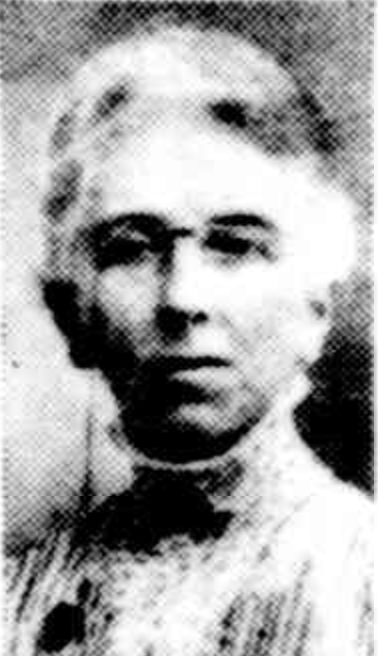
Caroline Jacob

Caroline Jacob (18 January 1861 – 4 November 1940) was a South Australian schoolmistress, remembered in connection with Tormore House School and Unley Park School.

== History ==
Caroline was born at Woodlands near Sevenhill and Penwortham, South Australia, the sixth child and third daughter of John Jacob (1816–1910) and his wife Mary Jacob, née Cowles, (c. 1819–1894). In 1869 the family moved to Mount Gambier, where her father had, controversially, been appointed Clerk of Court. In 1873 her mother re-opened Winnold House school, near Christ Church, Mount Gambier, which had until a few years previous been operated by the Misses or a Miss Fickling. It also served as their home. In 1878 the school was renamed Winnold House Ladies' College; its last year of advertised operation was 1886. Caroline, who had previously been home-educated, was at some stage enrolled at Winnold. She passed her first class certificate (later termed Intermediate) in May 1877, entered teachers training college 1879 and was appointed third assistant teacher at Port Adelaide in 1883, completed her second class (Leaving) that same year and was awarded her teachers certificate 1884. She studied physiology as a non-graduating student at the University in 1885 and won an Elder Prize for the subject. She had taught at Winnold for a few years.

Caroline was appointed to the Advanced School for Girls in 1885, and resigned 1897 to take over Tormore House School in Buxton Street, North Adelaide, from the Misses McMinn, Martha, Sallie and Lizzie. During the following year she had a new building constructed in Childers Street, followed by a home for boarders next door. Her sister Ann served as manager from c. 1900.

John Jacob lost his position in 1888 after 20 years' service; no reason was given and his valedictory in the Border Watch while describing him as "urbane and straightforward" fell far short of describing him as genial or sociable. His promised long service leave had without explanation been cut in half by the Government. He and Caroline had also served the (Anglican) Christ Church Sunday school for much of this time. After John Jacob's retirement he moved in with his daughter in Childers Street, North Adelaide.

In December 1906 she took over Ellen Thornber's school at Unley Park, which she kept running as a separate entity for four or five years, closing in 1911. Around the time of The Great War interest in private girls' schools declined, and Caroline wound down her schools, closing first Unley Park then Tormore (which became the "Andover" block of flats), and opening a smaller campus on Barton Terrace, North Adelaide. By December 1920 it was closed. Caroline occupied one of the "Andover" flats.

== Other interests ==
Caroline followed her family's dedication to the Anglican Church. In 1913 she was appointed to the board of Adelaide Diocesan Missionary Association.

She worked for the Collegiate Schools Association.

She founded the Headmistresses' Union, was active in the Kindergarten Union and its Training College, and was a member of the South Australian Advisory Council on Education.

== Family ==
John Jacob (30 July 1816 – 28 August 1910) was born in Andover, Hampshire, and left for Australia on the barque Juliet around July 1837, arriving at Launceston in November and arriving in South Australia on the William in January 1838. In 1839 he drove cattle overland from Sydney to McLaren Vale where he established a station. He helped establish his brother's cattle run "Moorooroo" on Jacob's Creek (named for William), between the Lyndoch Valley and Tanunda, and settled at "Woodlands", near Penwortham. He was a friend of explorer John Ainsworth Horrocks (1818–1846), the town's founder; his sister Ann Jacob (c. 1824 – 12 January 1874) married Arthur Horrocks ( – 1872), brother of the explorer. He and William took out a lease of 528 square miles (137,000 ha) at Paralana, near Arkaroola in the north of the Colony, but their stock was mostly wiped out by drought in the mid-1960s and he returned to the Barossa and for a time worked as a land agent in Mintaro. William developed "Moorooroo", growing wheat and planting grape vines.

John Jacob's brother William Jacob (c. 1815 – 14 July 1902) was an assistant surveyor to Col. William Light, arriving on the Rapid in 1836, and was later employed by Light's private company Light, Finniss & Co. He married Mary Bagot in 1842; their son Ian Jacob was manager of Mintaro Slate Quarry; another son Ross Blyth Jacob, as served with distinction during World War I as Lt. Col., 10th Australian Infantry Battalion, 1st AIF.

In 1848 John Jacob married Mary Cowles (c. 1819 – 11 May 1894) at S. Mark's Anglican Church, Penwortham, the first such service in the town. Their children included:

- Sarah Jacob (21 April 1851 – ) married Thomas Williams ( – ) on 2 July 1889, lived at 183 Archer Street, North Adelaide. They had three children.
- William Frederic Jacob (1852–1936) married Rosa Sarah Phelps ( –1930) on 17 August 1882
- Ann "Annie" Jacob (17 December 1853 – 11 January 1913) assisted Caroline at Tormore House School from c. 1900.
- John Jacob (9 February 1856 – 28 March 1929) pioneer of Geranium, married Anne "Annie" Searle (c. 1857 – 28 November 1940) on 9 February 1882. He was secretary of Bagot, Shaker & Lewis Ltd.
- Henry Jacob (4 August 1858 – 4 June 1916) married Florence Edith Wollaston ( –1960) on 28 December 1888, associated with Unitarian Church, Wakefield Street. He was chief draughtsman with Survey Department.

- Lorna Gledstanes Jacob (4 December 1889 – 22 May 1973) married Ernest Montgomerie Martin A.M.I.E.E. (22 April 1878 – 30 April 1956) on 27 September 1913. Ernest was a son of Henry Maydwell Martin of H. M. Martin and Son fame and nephew of Anna Montgomerie Martin.

- Mary Maydwell Martin (20 July 1915 – 25 January 1973), founder of Mary Martin Bookshop

- George Wollaston Jacob (1892 – 25 September 1917), killed in action in France.
- John Gilbert Jacob (1896 – 7 July 1918), twice wounded then killed in action in France.
- Denis Courtauld Jacob MM. (1897–) war hero, repatriated wounded, moved to Tasmania. Building Workers' Industrial Union official. Passport confiscated to prevent him attending conference in Moscow 1952. A policewoman was sacked shortly after attending one of his lectures.

- Caroline "Carrie" Jacob (18 January 1861 – 4 November 1940), subject of this article. was a teacher at Advanced School for Girls then Unley Park School (Thornber's)? then took over the Misses McMinn's Tormore School in North Adelaide; she took over Miss Thornber's School in 1910
- Mary Eleanor "Nellie" Jacob (16 June 1866 – ) married William Burnet Poole ( – ) in 1902

== Sources ==
- JACOB family PRG 558 (a .pdf document relating to memorabilia collection) State Library of South Australia
