= Catherine Thornber =

(1812–1894) schoolmistress

Catherine Maria Thornber (c. 1813 – 15 May 1894) was the founder of a school for girls in Unley Park, South Australia.

== History ==
Catherine Maria Thornber née Rowland (c. 1813 – 15 May 1894) was born in Rodd, Herefordshire. She and her husband Robert Thornber ( – 28 December 1854), and their four children lived in Harpurhey, near Manchester, then emigrated to South Australia on the Superb, arriving in November 1840. They settled first at Port Adelaide, then Kensington, finally a house later known as "Peliatt Villa" in Mitcham. Also on the Superb were Mrs. Thornber's parents Jane (c. 1790–1867) and Charles Rowland (c. 1790–1881), and her sister Mary Ellen Rowland (c. 1824–1911). Charles lost a fortune in some speculations, but managed to stay in business, trading as Thornber and Rowland until at least 1876, perhaps with one of his sons-in-law.

Robert Thornber, who was in business with his father-in-law, initially prospered, and in 1848 was able to donate an acre of land for St. Michael's Anglican Church, Mitcham, then suffered some severe financial setbacks, was declared insolvent and their home was put up for auction. He took a fatal dose of laudanum while suffering from delirium tremens. To make ends meet, Catherine started a school for girls in her home. "Mrs. Thornber's School", as it was popularly known, was successful and she was able to move to a larger house on 2 acres (0.81 ha) on Gover Street, Unley Park. Sometime before 1879 the street name was changed to Thornber Street.

Her two older daughters assisted in the operation of the school. The youngest, Ellen Thornber (1851–1947), trained as a teacher, and assisted in running the Grote Street teacher training college, then in 1880 was appointed assistant head of the Advanced School for Girls. She left in 1886 to become partner in her mother's school and helped prepare students for Adelaide University's matriculation exams. Students at the school were predominantly daughters of the clergy and professional men, attracted by its high standards in the teaching of science and languages, and by its liberal teaching methods, influenced by Fröbel and Montessori. The school building was enlarged with the addition of an upper storey.

Thornber died in 1894 and her eldest daughter, known as "Miss Catherine" and her two sisters ran the Unley Park School (as it had become known) at 37 Thornber Street until December 1906, when it was taken over by Caroline Jacob to become part of Tormore House School, and closed in 1911. Their home was at 39 Thornber Street.

== Family ==
Catherine Maria Thornber, née Rowland, (c. 1813 – 15 May 1894) was married to Robert Thornber ( – 28 December 1854). Their children included:

- Charles Rowland Thornber (9 June 1834 – 14 October 1920) married Elizabeth Ann ?? (c. 1841–1916) with the Moonta Mining Company. He was one of the first to be enrolled at St Peter's College and was involved with Alexander Tolmer's gold escorts. He was postmaster and librarian at Moonta for 43 years, died in Western Australia.
- Edward Thornber ( – 1 April 1905), also one of the first students at St Peter's College, worked as a commission agent, had a small farm of 2 acres (0.81 ha) on Unley Road and made some excellent wine; moved to Broken Hill, where he died.
- Catherine Maria Thornber (17 November 1837 – 30 September 1924) ran the school after death of her mother. She was generally known as "Miss Thornber", and her mother, who had the same names, as "Mrs. Thornber". The Thornber University Scholarship was founded in her memory in 1925.
- Rachel Thornber (3 March 1839 – 4 February 1930), overshadowed by her sisters, managed the boarding house.
- Robert Henry Thornber (1847 – May 1930) married Mina Cook on 21 February 1873. He was with the Bank of South Australia, then the Union Bank of Australia, later at Young, New South Wales
- Ellen Thornber (1851 – 18 March 1947) was strong on education theory and practice; maintained the high academic standards of the school.
