= Rica Hübbe =

Australian medical doctor and teacher

Edith Ulrica Hübbe (10 October 1885 – 15 August 1967), invariably referred to as Rica Hübbe or Hubbe, was a South Australian medical doctor and teacher.

== History ==
Samuel Grau "Sam" Hübbe (c. 1848 – 12 September 1900) was the first South Australian commissioned officer to be killed in the Boer War. A practising Unitarian, he was a son of Ulrich Hübbe, who was important in the development of the Torrens Title system of land registration. Edith Agnes Cook (1859 – 2 April 1942) was in 1876 the first female student at the University of Adelaide, and second principal of the Advanced School for Girls. They were married at the Cook home, Norwood, by John Crawford Woods on 3 January 1885.

Hübbe was born in Norwood, South Australia, the first child of surveyor and explorer Samuel Grau Hübbe and Edith Agnes Hübbe. Her education culminated in three years at the Advanced School for Girls, where her mother was once Principal, and was a successful student, awarded the Old Scholars' Prize for high achievements in the 1903 Leaving examinations, as well as some successes on the tennis court.

Hübbe, her sister Marjorie Hübbe and, until she married, Ethel Holder, taught at her mother's school at 17 and 23 Statenborough Street, Knightsbridge (later known as Leabrook). She completed, by part-time study, several demanding degrees —

- She studied for a BA, and completed her Masters with third class honours in 1908.
- She studied medicine 1915–1922 at the University of Adelaide graduating M.B., B.S., then registered as a medical practitioner.

Knightsbridge School closed in 1922, and was taken over by the Misses Jones and Wells, after which Hübbe went into private practice and her sister Marjorie was married to Alfred Beech Caw by George Hale.

From 1927 to 1933 she was an instructor in Physiology and demonstrator in Biochemistry (1929 appointment) at the University of Adelaide.

== Other interests ==
Hübbe was a member of Adelaide's Lyceum Club; she was the club's longstanding secretary, from 1928 to 1950, in which year she appears to have ceased being a member.

== Family ==
- Edith Agnes Cook (1859 – 2 April 1942) married Samuel Grau "Sam" Hübbe (c. 1848 – 12 September 1900) on 3 January 1885. A practising Unitarian, he was killed in the Boer War. Edith Hübbe conducted Knightsbridge School, later with assistance from daughters Rica and Marjorie.

- Dr Edith Ulrica "Rica" Hübbe (10 October 1885 – 1967), the subject of this article. She never married.
- Janet Doris Hübbe (1887–1950) married Alfred Allen Simpson (1875–1939) in 1910. They brought up their influential family at "Undelcarra", Burnside.
- Sgt Max Ulrich Hübbe (28 May 1891 – ) fought with 1st AIF, then farmed at Woodenup, near Kojonup, Western Australia.
- (Harriet) Marjorie Hübbe (1893–1993) taught at Knightsbridge School, then married Alfred Beech Caw ( – 1966) on 22 February 1922, farmed at Woodenup.
- Capt.(Hermann) Fritz Hübbe (1895 – 28 July 1916) enlisted with 1st AIF, was killed in action, France.
