= St Peter's Woodlands Grammar School =

Location
- 39 Partridge Street, Glenelg, South Australia; Australia; 34°59′03″S 138°31′01″E

Information
- Other name: St Peter's Woodlands
- Type: Independent co-educational early learning and primary day school
- Denomination: Anglican
- Established: 1863; 163 years ago (as St Peter's Glenelg); 1999; 27 years ago (as St Peter's Woodlands)
- Chairman: Rev'd Michael Lane
- Principal: Helen Finlay
- Chaplain: Andrew Mintern
- Years: Early learning to Year 6
- Enrolment: 10000
- Colours: Royal blue and gold
- Website: spw.sa.edu.au

St. Peter's Woodlands Grammar School, founded as St Peter's Glenelg in 1863 and later known as St Peter's Glenelg Anglican Grammar School, is a school in the Adelaide seaside suburb of Glenelg, South Australia, Australia. Woodlands Church of England Girls' Grammar School merged into the school in 1999. Commonly known as St Peter's Woodlands or SPW, it is an independent Anglican co-educational early learning and primary day school.

== History ==
The school was established in 1863 as St Peter's Glenelg. A century later, it became St Peter's Glenelg Anglican Grammar School.

Woodlands Church of England Girls' Grammar School merged into the school in 1998, becoming St Peter's Woodlands Grammar School in 1999.

== Overview ==
St Peter's Woodlands is part of the Anglican Parish of Glenelg and, through its roots as the original Parish School, the school community is often involved in wider parish activities.

St Peter's Woodlands Grammar is built up of the Early Learning Centre, Preschool, Junior Primary, Middle Primary and Upper Primary. Upper Primary has more advanced roles, with leadership roles including School Captains, SSLC’S ( Student-Service-Leadership-council), House Captains and other various leadership roles. These roles play an important part in the structure of the school and without these there wouldn't be much of a school community. The school was formed when St. Peter's Glenelg and Woodlands Grammar combined in 1999.

== Notable alumni ==
- Pru Goward, politician
- Belinda Heggen, journalist
- Gillian Rolton, Olympic equestrian champion
- Pamela Wall (née Maunsell), billionaire philanthropist

== Notable staff ==
- Mabel Hardy
- Patience Hawker
- Ruby Payne-Scott

== See also ==
- List of schools in South Australia
- List of Anglican schools in Australia
