= Phoebe Chapple =

Australian medical doctor (1879-1967)

Phoebe Chapple MM MBBS BSc
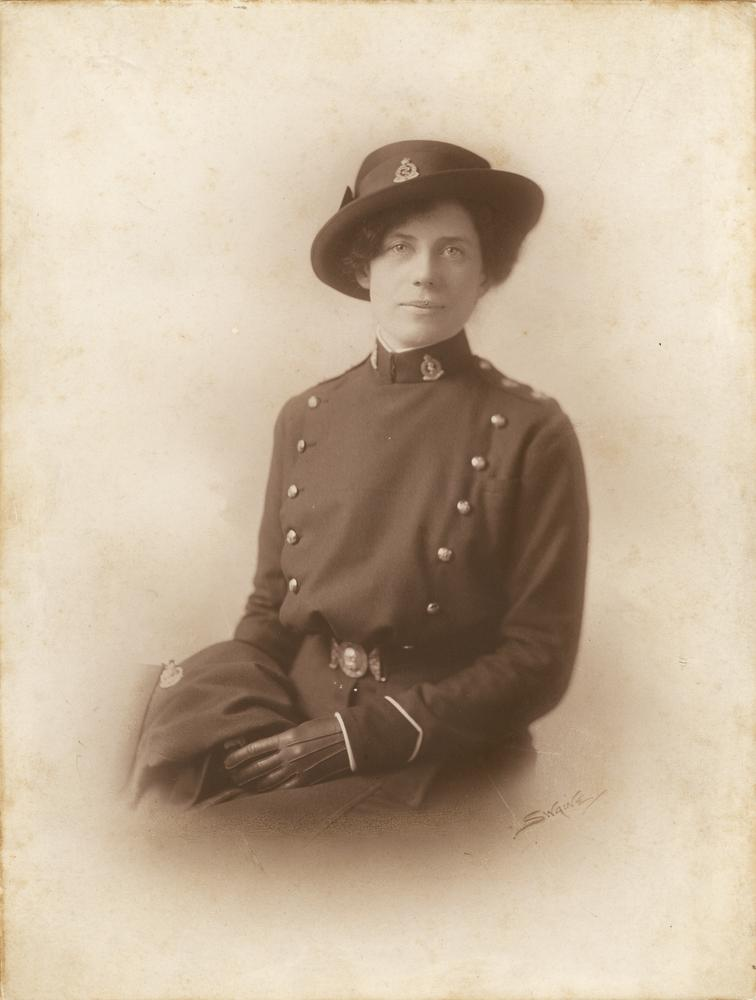
- Phoebe Chapple during the First World War
- Born: March 31, 1879; Adelaide, South Australia
- Died: March 24, 1967 (aged 87); Adelaide, South Australia
- Military career
- Branch: Royal Army Medical Corps
- Service years: 1917–1919
- Rank: Captain
- Unit: Women's Army Auxiliary Corps
- Known for: Tending to wounded in a trench in the dark for hours after an air raid
- World War I: QMAAC’s Camp 1 near Abbeville
- Awards: Military Medal

Phoebe Chapple MM MBBS BSc (31 March 1879 – 24 March 1967) was a South Australian medical doctor, decorated for her heroic service in France during World War I.

== Early life and education ==
Phoebe was born in Adelaide, South Australia, 31 March 1879. She was the youngest daughter of Frederic Chapple and his wife Elizabeth Sarah Chapple, née Hunter (c. 1845 – 19 October 1930), who left England for Australia in 1876 to take up the position of headmaster of Prince Alfred College, a Methodist school for boys in the inner eastern suburbs of Adelaide.

Phoebe may have received her early education at home, as her name does not appear in newspapers until 1891, from when she was a conspicuously successful student at the Advanced School for Girls, a radical new institution founded by the South Australian government to prepare able girls for entry to the University of Adelaide. She matriculated in 1895 and commenced the Bachelor of Science course in 1896, and was conferred with her BSc in 1898. She went on to study Medicine, and qualified MB and BS in 1904.

Between 1896 and 1908, Chapple and Edith Lavington Tite (1877–1955) were associated with Our Girls' Institute, an offshoot of the YWCA, and sister organization of Our Boys' Institute.

== Career ==
She served at the Adelaide Hospital as house surgeon in 1905, then in 1906 and 1907 worked with the Sydney Medical Mission, a service founded by Dame Emma Dixson and run by women for women of the poorer areas of the city. She returned to Adelaide late in 1907 and set up in practice at 28 North Terrace, where she still had a practice in 1917. She also had some kind of arrangement with Prince Alfred College. She entered into commercial arrangements with several Friendly Societies: the Victoria Tent of the I. O. Rechabites, and The Federal Benefit Society of South Australia; She conducted first aid courses in conjunction with the YWCA and St John Ambulance Brigade. She was medical officer to the South Australian Refuge (from 1858 to 1903 called the South Australian Female Refuge) at "Norwood House", 48 William Street, Norwood from 1908 to 1935.

Chapple did a great deal of work of a charitable nature without charge. From around 1910 she was acting as honorary surgeon, later honorary superintendent at the Salvation Army's maternity hospital in Carrington Street then that organization's McBride Maternity Hospital from 1914. Situated in Briar Avenue, Medindie, the building previously known as "The Briars" was built for G. C. Hawker and named for donor Robert J. McBride. She was to work for that hospital until 1929.

For some years she gave her services to the Children's Home established at Magill by Sister Grace and the Methodist Central Mission in 1914. When her father retired as headmaster of Prince Alfred College in 1914, he purchased for her a residence at 26 The Parade, Norwood, where he and Mrs Chapple were to live out their lives. Chapple moved to 115 Kensington road, Norwood in 1929 or earlier. One or other of these homes was dubbed "Tintagel".

=== World War I ===
She wished to volunteer for active service in the Great War, and as the Australian forces had no intention of employing women doctors, she sailed to England at her own expense in February 1917, intending to join the Scottish Women's Hospitals for Foreign Service which had called for 400 suitably qualified women. In company with W. Taylor and P. Bartels, she arrived in April, and was soon appointed as surgeon with the Cambridge Military Hospital at Aldershot, attending to wounded soldiers. In November 1917, she was appointed honorary Captain in the Royal Army Medical Corps (RAMC), and attached to the Women's Army Auxiliary Corps (WAAC), (from 1918 known as Queen Mary's Army Auxiliary Corps), which was preparing to embark for France, and she was one of the first to go. On 29 May 1918, Chapple was at a WAAC camp near Abbeville during an air raid, when a bomb exploded on a covered trench used by the women as a shelter, killing eight and wounding nine, one mortally. Working in the dark for hours, Chapple moved through the destroyed trench tending to wounded. For this, she was awarded the Military Medal, the first woman doctor to be so decorated, presented at Buckingham Palace in June 1919. The citation for the award reads:

For gallantry and devotion to duty during an enemy air raid. While the raid was in progress Doctor Chapple attended to the needs of the wounded regardless of her own safety.

The appropriate gallantry decoration for officers was the Military Cross. Women were however not eligible for an officer’s commission, with Chapple having only an honorary rank of captain. Hence she was awarded the Military Medal, the equivalent reward for other ranks. She was also promoted to honorary Major. She next served at Rouen and Le Havre, and at the cessation of hostilities embarked on further training in England. She returned to Adelaide on the Orsova in September 1919.

=== Post World War I ===
She stood for election to the Robe ward of the Adelaide City Council in December 1919, as a representative of the Women's Non-Party Political Association, but was narrowly defeated by John Stace Rees. Amy Louisa Tomkinson had two years earlier stood for the same ward against the same male incumbent with a similar outcome (and both women fared much better than did Frederic Blakeney Shoobridge in 1921 against the same opponent). In December 1919, Chapple and Dr. Harold Rischbieth were appointed surgeons to the clinical department of the Adelaide Hospital.

Much of her medical work was in obstetrics and gynaecology; she was on occasion called upon as expert witness in cases of death brought about as a result of abortions, usually from peritonitis or septicaemia.

The influenza epidemic of 1931 kept her busy: she made 100 visits to the Methodist Children's home alone, all pro bono.

Her last overseas trip was in March 1937, when she sailed for London in the Orion to attend the coronation as an official guest, staying with her brother Harold, and did not return until October. While in Britain, she attended the Medical Women's International Conference in Edinburgh, at which she was the accredited Australian representative, and the annual meeting of the B.M.A., held in Belfast. While away, her niece Dr. Margaret Haslam, acted as locum tenens.

=== World War II ===
During World War II, she was active with the Voluntary Services Detachments.

== Personal life ==
Chapple was Patroness of the British Ex-Servicewomen's Fellowship, and a member of the Adelaide Ladies' Rifle Club.

Her name was prominent in the "social pages" of South Australian newspapers, at the racetrack, concerts or at fashionable receptions. She travelled often, keeping in touch with interstate and overseas members of her fragmented family, and hosting them when they visited Adelaide. She maintained a lifelong friendship with fellow women doctors like Helen Mayo and her old mentor Violet Plummer. Among non-medical friends were vigneron Reg. Walker and his wife Ethel, née Russell, and was a witness in their vitriolic and highly public divorce.

She died on 24 March 1967, at age 87, and was cremated with a military funeral. Her ashes were interred at the Centennial Park Cemetery in Adelaide. Her will provided for a bursary to be awarded in her name to students of St Ann's College, University of Adelaide.

== See also ==
Some other Australasian women doctors of the period

- Katie Louisa Ardill (1886–1955) NSW
- Agnes Elizabeth Lloyd Bennett (1872–1960) NSW – NZ
- Eleanor Elizabeth Bourne (1878–1957) QLD
- Vera Scantlebury Brown (1889–1946) VIC
- Lilian Violet Cooper (1861–1947) QLD
- Elsie Jean Dalyell (1881–1948) NSW
- Mary Clementina De Garis (1881–1963) SA
- Lucy Edith Gullett (1876–1949) VIC
- Gertrude Halley (1867–1939) SA
- Laura Margaret Hope née Fowler (1868–1952) SA
- Elaine Marjory Little (1884–1974) QLD
- Helen Mayo (1878–1967) SA
- Violet Plummer (1873–1962) SA
- Jessie Scott (1883–1959) NZ
- Hannah Mary Helen Sexton, known as Helen Sexton (1862–1950) VIC
