= Arthur Hardy (businessman) =

Australian politician (1817–1909)

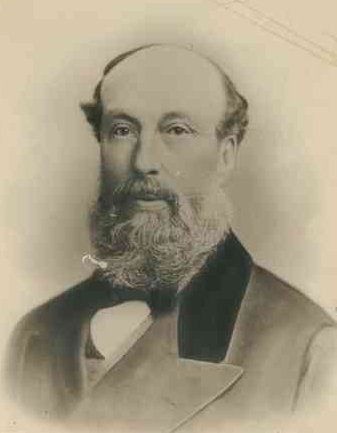
Arthur Hardy ca. 1858

Arthur Hardy (1817 – 13 July 1909), British born Australian pastoralist, barrister, quarry-owner, businessman and politician, was a successful South Australian colonial settler who is also known for a number of other achievements, including building the mansions Birksgate and Mount Lofty House, and establishing (and funding) the Glen Osmond Institute.

== History ==
Hardy was born in Yorkshire and trained as a lawyer. On his doctor's advice to seek a warmer climate, he migrated to South Australia on the Platina, arriving in February 1839, his brother Alfred Hardy (1813–1870) having migrated there in September 1836 on the Cygnet as one of William Light's surveyors, appointed Town Surveyor in 1839 then sacked in 1842 during Governor Grey's cutbacks.

Hardy bought some sheep which he pastured at his property "Shepley" (now the suburb of Paradise). He also practised law with dealings in the Supreme Court, and was later appointed as Crown Prosecutor. In 1848 he returned to England to marry, and returned on the Mary Ann in June 1850, and commissioned the building of "Birksgate" on land he had purchased from E. C. Frome sometime around 1845. In the 1850s he purchased around 1,000 acres (400 ha) on Mount Lofty, where in 1856 he built a summer retreat, "Mount Lofty House". This in 1863 became his only residence, and in 1864 he sold "Birksgate" to Thomas Elder. He was fond of entertaining and a standard of gracious living which he could not support, and after some reverses was obliged to sell Mount Lofty House and take his second son Herbert out of St. Peter's College (elder son Arthur Marmaduke had been to Marlborough College, London).

Hardy represented Albert in the South Australian House of Assembly from 22 February 1875 to 8 February 1886 and 9 May 1886 to 5 April 1887.

He continued practising law well into his 90th year, the oldest member of the South Australian Supreme Court, and was still attending the office every morning.

== Family ==
Arthur Hardy (1817–1909) married Martha Price (c. 1821 – 18 June 1904) in England on 30 August 1849. Their children were:

- Arthur Marmaduke Hardy (11 October 1851 – 13 August 1934) married Catherine Louise Hallett ( – ) on 16 April 1878. He was a solicitor in Port Augusta.

- Mary Wentworth Hardy (7 February 1879 – 1962)

- Mabel Hardy (20 July 1853 – 15 July 1924), lived at Glenelg
- Herbert Mansell Hardy (1856 – 1927) married Miriam Isabella Cunningham (1855 – 11 March 1950) on 15 August 1889

- Mabel Phyllis Hardy (11 April 1890 – 1977) Mabel and Frederick were twins, born prematurely. Mabel was a highly regarded teacher, co-founder of Stawell School.
- Frederick Mansell Hardy (11 April 1890 – 1965) married Vida Marie Nadebaum (1894 – 1971)
- Kate Isabella (Isobel?) Hardy (28 March 1892 – 1986)
- Margaret De Guerin Hardy (3 May 1904 – 1997)

- Ethel Hardy (1858 – 18 June 1945) married Caulfield Barton ( – 1937) on 23 April 1884
