= Advanced School for Girls =

South Australian State school

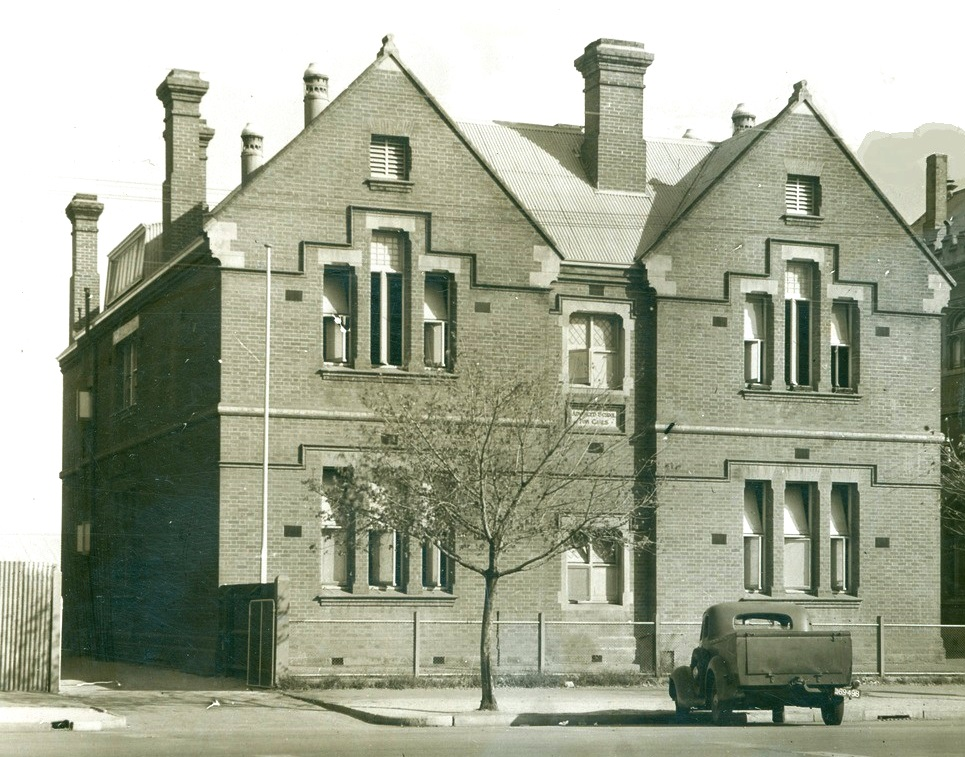
Advanced School for Girls building, later part of Adelaide High School

The Advanced School for Girls was a South Australian State school whose purpose was to prepare girls to qualify for entry to the University of Adelaide. Founded in 1879, the school merged with Adelaide High School in 1907.

== History ==
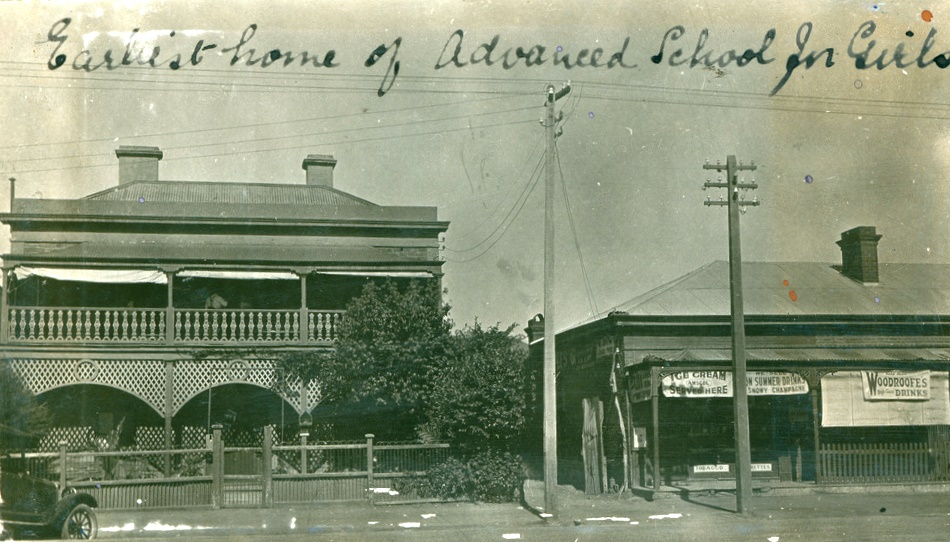
Advanced School's first premises, previously home of Dr. Butler, some 30 years after the School had moved.

From its inception, the University of Adelaide welcomed female students, although degrees were not available to females until 1880. At first, the only schools preparing girls to matriculation level were small private colleges such as Miss Martin's School and Parliament considered that education of women should be on a more structured basis, and the "Education Act of 1875" provided for establishment of a government-funded Advanced School.

The first appointments were for a headmistress and assistant head: Jane Stanes and Edith Cook (both transferred from the Grote Street Model School), followed by Rene-Armand Martin (French). Stanes resigned the following year, ostensibly due to ill-health, and Cook was promoted to head in 1882. A Government regulation, stipulating that the head must be aged 25, had to be waived for her to be appointed, as she was only 20. The Minister of Education (Thomas King) did not approve, but his successor (J. Langdon Parsons) pushed it through.

The school, in the two-storey former residence of Dr Lambert Butler, Franklin Street, was opened on 7 October 1879 with sixteen students passing the entrance examination. Additional appointments were made in 1880: Madeline Rees George (German), Ellen Thornber (assistant), Kate C. Brown (assistant). Sarah Cargill, well connected and a founder of Brisbane Grammar School, was appointed head teacher June 1880, but never took up the position. By September 1880 the number of students was 92. The following year, there were more applicants than places. By 1882, girls from the school were prominent in the matriculation results: two of the top nine were from the Advanced School. In 1883, both recipients of the Sir Thomas Elder prize for physiology were students of the Advanced School.

Many criticisms were leveled against the school: that it robbed educated widows of a source of income as tutors; that by conducting an entrance examination and by not conducting junior classes it had an unfair advantage over other schools; and that by offering French and German rather than the more difficult (and essential for University degrees) Latin and Greek, it was gaining an inflated reputation and at the same time robbing talented women of opportunities.

In 1891 a new purpose-built building on Grote Street was completed. The move from Franklin Street enabled the number of students to be raised from 124 to 150. This building still stands today (2016).

== Combining with Adelaide High School ==
The Grote Street Model School and the Training School (a teachers' training college) were amalgamated, forming the Continuation School for Boys, which then amalgamated with the Advanced School for Girls, creating Adelaide High School on 24 September 1908. The headmaster from 1909 until 1919 was W. J. Adey, later Director of Education.

In 1951 the school divided into the Adelaide Boys' High School and the Adelaide Girls' High School under headmistress Mary Veta Macghey.

== Staff ==
- Edith Alice Bowen (1862–1932) appointed assistant 1882; married George Craig in 1892
- Kate Cormac Brown (c. 1860–1891) appointed assistant 1880, then at private school; suicide 1891
- Edith Agnes Cook (1859–1942) married Samuel Grau "Sam" Hübbe ( – c. 15 October 1900) in 1885. She was the first female student at Adelaide University, second headmistress of ASG, later of Burnside school. Her daughter, Dr. Edith Ulrica "Rica" Hübbe (1885–1967), was a student
- Katherine Dixon Cook (1874–1960), sister of Rica Cook, was music teacher until merger with Adelaide High School
- Charlotte Jane Ellershaw (1865–1954): pupil teacher in 1882
- Madeline E. Rees George (c. 1851–1931) : taught German; in 1880 left to conduct Miss Woolcock's School in North Adelaide, returned 1886 as headmistress, then head of Adelaide High School.
- Agnes Marie Johanna Heyne (1871–1958) married Rev. Caspar Dorsch in 1893
- Laura Olga Hedwig Heyne (1873–1959) with Advanced School 1900–1908, then Adelaide High.
- Ethel Holder MA. and Rica Hübbe were brought in as teachers while Rees George was overseas in 1907.
- Caroline Jacob (1861–1940) in December 1897 took over the Misses McMinn's Tormore House School in North Adelaide; she took over Miss Thornber's School in December 1906
- Ellen Magdalen Lewis (1848–1934) drawing teacher 1888–1892
- René Armand Martin: French master. One of the first appointments, and one of the few males but gone by 1880; later with Sydney Grammar School.
- Minnietta Maughan (c. 1862–1947) married Rev. Thomas McNeil on 6 April 1912. She was a daughter of Rev. James Maughan.
- Caroline Ellen "Carrie" Sells (1868–1956) married James Sadler on 18 June 1932. She was last surviving ASG teacher
- Elizabeth Emily Sheppard (1866–1939) pupil teacher 1882.
- Jane Sarah "Jeanne" Stanes (1846–1932) married Henry Alfred Doudy (1849–1931) in 1880. She wrote and a book on early Australian history, The Magic of Dawn, credited as "Mrs Henry A. Doudy".
- Ellen Thornber (1851–1947) was daughter of Catherine Maria Thornber (–1894) who in 1855 founded "Mrs Thornber's School" at Gover (later renamed Thornber) Street, Unley Park. Ellen was second mistress of ASG, then ran her mother's school with two sisters Catherine Maria Thornber (died 1924) and Rachel (died 1930) until December 1906, when it was taken over by Caroline Jacob to become part of Tormore House School.

== Notable alumnae ==
- Ada Mary a'Beckett M.Sc. CBE (1872–20 May 1948), née Lambert, biologist, first woman lecturer at Melbourne University.
- Dr Eleanor Allen, psychologist of Adelaide
- Ethel Ambrose, medical missionary to India
- Mabel Jewell Baker, head mistress of Walford School, Unley
- Graemme Barbour, senior mistress of Adelaide High School
- Dr Phoebe Chapple
- Florence Cooke Mus. Bac.(3 June 1888 – 11 December 1953), violinist and teacher of music
- Dr Constance May Cooper married Arthur Kent Newbery in 1909
- Bessie Davidson, an artist of European reputation
- Dr Eulalie Dawson (née Burnard)
- Violet de Mole, well known as a teacher of French in Adelaide
- Edith Emily Dornwell, in 1885 the first woman graduate in science at Adelaide University; married Lionel Charles Raymond in 1895, and moved to New South Wales
- Edith Josephine Gardner married Cuthbert Viner Smith on 2 April 1910
- Elsie Hamilton, another gifted musician
- Charlotte Harry OBE, married stationer James Leonard Leal in 1911
- Florence Haycraft BSc.
- Agnes Marie Johanna Heyne BA married Rev. Caspar Dorsch, mother and stepmother of a remarkable family
- Ethel Adelaide Hinde née Ayliffe (1868–1944), a.k.a. Ethelwyn Hamilton Hinde, founder and Principal of Riverside School
- Ethel Holder MA became art teacher, involved with Old Scholars Association
- Stella Howchin B.Sc.
- Dr Edith Ulrica "Rica" Hübbe (1885–1967)
- Doris Egerton Jones (1889–1973), Sydney author and playwright
- Dr Helen Mayo
- Dr Gertrude Mead daughter of Rev. Silas Mead
- Dr Violet Plummer (1887–1890)
- E. Dorothea Proud DSc., CBE., first winner of the Catherine Helen Spence Scholarship. She married Gordon A. Pavy in 1917
- Maude Mary Puddy AMUA, Mus. Bac., pianist, with a reputation in Europe as well as in Australia
- Bessie Rischbieth, noted feminist
- Susie Solomon BSc.
- Agnes Louisa Storrie for 17 years contributed poems to The Australasian. She married John Wilson Kettlewell in 1890
- Anna Trudinger BA, missionary to China where she married Rev. William Robertson Malcolm, settled in NZ.
- Constance Mary "Connie" Verco married architect Eric Habershon McMichael in 1909.
- Nellie Walker B.Sc.
- Dora Frances Williams (1874 – 13 November 1950), married Thomas Slaney Poole in 1903, and
- Eva Roubel Williams married Frederick Augustus d'Arenberg, both daughters of the Rev. Francis Williams, head master of St Peter's College.
- Charlotte Elizabeth Arabella "Lottie" Wright (1867 – 15 March 1951), first woman to gain her BA at Adelaide University; proprietor and principal, Semaphore (Girls) High School 1890–99; married Frederick A. Graham in Kalgoorlie 1900, secretary WFMA (Women's Foreign Missionary Auxiliary), peace activist of Subiaco.

A reunion in 1948 to recognise Mrs Sadler was attended by ex-students Dr Violet Plummer, Dr Phoebe Chapple, Dr Rica Hubbe, Dr Constance Cooper, Dr Helen Mayo, Mabel Jewell Baker (of Walford House), Mrs Hinde (principal of Riverside School), Bessie Davidson, Maude Puddy, Elsie Hamilton, Dora Proud, and Doris Egerton Jones.
