= Tormore House School =

Former school in North Adelaide, South Australia

Tormore School was a private boarding and day school for girls in North Adelaide, South Australia, from 1876 until 1920. Its premises moved a few times.

== History ==
Tormore House had its origins in a small school for girls set up by Elizabeth McMinn and her two sisters Sarah Hamill "Sally" McMinn and Martha McMinn, on Molesworth Street, North Adelaide in 1876. This may have been their family home, in which their father Joseph died two years earlier. In February 1884 the McMinn sisters moved their school to another property on nearby Buxton Street, which they dubbed "Tormore" for their birthplace in Ireland. Tormore was an ancient parish in Ireland.

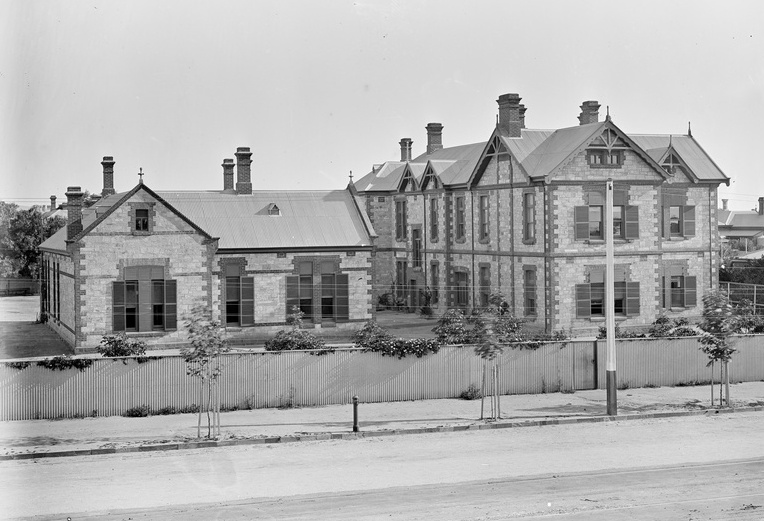
Tormore House School, Childers Street, North Adelaide

The premises had previously housed John Whinham's North Adelaide Grammar School, which he relinquished to move to larger premises at the corner of Ward and Jeffcott Streets. The school was taken over by Ann and Caroline Jacob towards the end of 1897, and the McMinn sisters left Adelaide on 15 December, retiring to Ealing Common, England. The school moved to new premises at 211 Childers Street in January 1899, with a house for boarders alongside.

In 1907 Caroline Jacob took over the Unley Park Grammar School and ran the two institutions concurrently. Around this time substantial improvements were made: separate facilities for the younger (8–12 y.o.) students and additional premises for boarders, art studies and a kindergarten. Caroline Jacob's father financed the construction of a gymnasium, which also served as a large meeting-hall.

School enrolments declined greatly during World War I; negotiations with (Anglican) Bishop Nutter Thomas for incorporation into the Church education system came to nothing, and in 1918 the school moved to smaller premises in Barton Terrace, and the Childers Street premises became the "Andover" residential flats. The school closed in 1920. "Andover" later became the site of the Kindergarten Teachers College, then the Kingston College of Advanced Education in 1974. The subdivided area is now known as Tormore Place.

A Tormore Old Scholars' Association was active from at least 1906 to 1954, and a reunion held in 1936 exclusively of the McMinn sisters' students, attracted over 60 old scholars.

== Notable students ==
- Esther Gwendolyn "Stella" Bowen (1893–1947) one of three women appointed official war artists WWII
- Phyllis Dorothy Cilento née McGlew (1894–1987)
- Francisca Adriana "Paquita" Delprat, daughter of G. D. Delprat and wife of Douglas Mawson
- Heather Gell (1896–1988) leading exponent of Dalcroze Eurhythmics
- Gladys Reynell (1881–1956)

== Teaching staff ==
- Ellen Ida Benham, BSc. (1871–1917) taught science until 1912, then bought Walford School (later Walford Church of England Girls' Grammar School) in Malvern
- John Millard Dunn (1865–1936), organist and choirmaster for St. Peter's Cathedral, taught singing and music theory
- Hilda Farsky BA (1880–1950), married Frederick William Eardley (1874–1958) in 1909
- Rosa Fiveash (1854–1938), drawing teacher
- Ida Doreen Hamilton (died 1969) drawing teacher
- Helen Milvain Good (–1941)
- Mabel Phyllis Hardy (1890–1977) student at Tormore then taught at Unley Park campus, later proprietor and headmistress of Stawell School, Mount Lofty
- S(ophia) E(llen) Holder BA (1882–1960) mayoress of Victor Harbor
- Ann "Annie" Jacob (17 December 1853 – 11 January 1913), Caroline's sister
- Arabella Aldersey Manning (1868–1949) married Charles Mather Leumane (c. 1845–1928) on 21 December 1907. She was drawing teacher, 1900 to 1907. He was an operatic tenor and singing teacher.
- Mary A. Overbury (–1926) prominent artist Later had her own school at Hawthorn.
- Hilda Adelaide Sidney Tucker (1880-1945), vice principal from c. 1915
