= Our Boys Institute =

Junior chapter of YMCA in Adelaide, South Australia

Our Boys' Institute
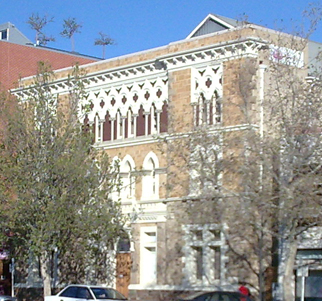
- The former Our Boys Institute building in 2009
- Alternative names: OBI

General information
- Type: Youth institute
- Architectural style: Venetian Gothic
- Location: 219–223 Wakefield Street, Adelaide, South Australia, Australia
- Year built: 1896–1897
- Opened: 23 February 1897
- Client: Our Boys' Institute

Technical details
- Material: Sandstone façade
- Floor count: 3

Design and construction
- Architect: F. W. Dancker

South Australian Heritage Register
- Official name: Former Our Boys' Institute Building (Facade)
- Designated: 24 July 1980
- Reference no.: 10890

Our Boys Institute (OBI) was a junior branch of YMCA in South Australia, catering for boys aged 13–18, a forerunner to the various youth groups which flourished in the first half of the twentieth century such as the Boys' Brigade, Scouting, etc. OBI promoted a Christian philosophy and also ran camps and provided employment assistance for young men.

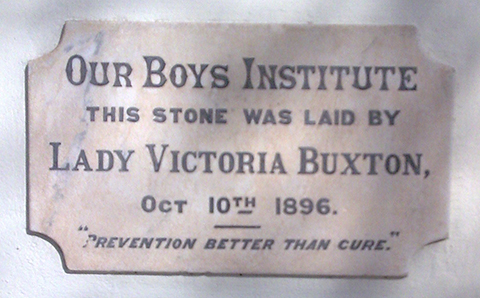
Plaque located on façade of building.

OBI had its own purpose-built premises at 221 Wakefield Street, Adelaide, which were opened in 1896, and included lecture and games rooms, indoor running track and pool. At its opening on 23 February 1897 there was an exhibition match of basketball between boys from the OBI and the YMCA, the first recorded basketball match in Australia.

F. W. Dancker was the architect for the building. The carved sandstone Venetian Gothic façade of the building was listed on the South Australian Heritage Register on 24 July 1980. The façade of the Our Boys Institute bears similarities to the Chicago Athletic Association Building; it has been suggested that Danker was influenced by the club and its architect, Henry Ives Cobb.

The building has since been used as office space and an external studies college and was converted by architects JPE Design Studio to a boutique hotel in 2008. The hotel opened as Wakefield Residence but has since changed the name to Adabco Boutique Hotel.

A plaque on the facade of the building commemorates the role played by Lady Victoria Buxton, the wife of the South Australian Governor, Sir Thomas Buxton. Lady Buxton, who lived in Adelaide between 1895 and 1898, was a Christian philanthropist who supported the Mothers' Union and YWCA.

Our Girls' Institute was a similar organization run under the auspices of the YWCA. Phoebe Chapple (1879–1967) and Edith Lavington Tite (1877–1955) were prominent leaders.
