= Susan Mary Crompton =

Australian welfare reformer

Susan Mary Crompton (née Clark) (1846–1932), known as Mary, was a diarist and social welfare reformer. She was born in the United Kingdom but moved to Australia when she was four. She was best known for her involvement in the “boarding out system” for destitute children and joined the committee of the State Children's Council in 1906. In World War I she was made a justice of the peace, one of the first women in South Australia chosen for this office.

== UK to Australia ==
Crompton's parents were Francis (1799-1853) and Caroline (née Hill; 1800–77) Clark. Francis was a silversmith of Birmingham who founded Francis Clark and Sons, and Caroline was a sister of Rowland Hill. Francis and Caroline emigrated to South Australia on the Fatima with their children, Caroline Emily Clark (1825–1911), Algernon Sidney (1826–1908), John Howard (1830–78), Henry Septimus (1837–64), Ellen Rosa (1838–99), Matthew Symonds (1839–1920) and Susan Mary (1846–1932). They arrived at Port Adelaide on 11 June 1850.

== Honeymoon voyage to Europe ==
Mary married Joseph Crompton, who had emigrated to Australia in 1860, travelling on the SS Great Britain. He was a vigneron, manufacturer and exporter who founded several companies, such as Crompton and Sons. After the wedding, the Cromptons travelled on the SS Great Britain from Melbourne to Liverpool. She kept a diary of the voyage, which was later published and titled Journal of a Honeymoon Voyage in S.S. Great Britain. In her diary she describes eating at the captain’s table in the first-class dining saloon. The voyage quickly became rough, and Mary recorded that she was proud that she was not seasick. There were more than 800 people on board, 700 of whom were passengers and eight stowaways. The voyage took 68 days and was captained by John Gray (master mariner). Mary enjoyed the journey and the company of most of the passengers on this two-month voyage.

On their return to Australia, the couple settled in Adelaide and had seven sons and five daughters.

== Involvement in the Australian welfare system ==
Crompton's sister Caroline Emily Clark known as Emily Clark was an active social reformer well known for championing the cause of children in institutions and founding the "boarding-out system" for settling orphan children with foster families in Adelaide. She began working for Emily and later joined the committee of the State Children's Council in 1906. During World War I she was made a justice of the peace, one of the first women in South Australia chosen for this office.

Crompton died at Stoneyfell aged 86, in 1932.

== Clark family archives ==
Documents connected to Crompton, and the rest of the Clark family are held in the State Library of South Australia.
