= Heinrich Vosz =

Hardware merchant and paint manufacturer (1812–1886)

H. L. Vosz was an Adelaide, South Australia business, for a time Australia's largest supplier of paints and glass, the earliest progenitor of Dulux paints, and became the prosperous glass merchant A. E. Clarkson Ltd. The company was founded in a modest way by a painter, plumber and glazier of more than usual business acumen, who unwittingly became the name behind many of the stained glass windows in South Australian churches and public buildings.

== The founder ==
Heinrich Ludwig Vosz (3 May 1812 – 9 March 1886), was born in Hanover in humble circumstances, and when quite young moved with his parents to Hamburg, where he had to work for a living from age 12. At 15 he was apprenticed to a carpenter and eventually was able to set up in business on his account. He was doing well until the European revolutions of 1848, which destroyed his business, leaving him bankrupt. He emigrated to South Australia aboard Alfred with his wife and two young sons arriving in December 1848. He started work as a joiner in Ackland Street (now that part of Frome Street between Grenfell and Wakefield streets) and was naturalized in August 1849. In 1848 he was selling furniture and in 1849 had a timber yard in partnership with C. E. Berthau. Then came the discovery of gold in Victoria, and in 1851 he joined the rush to the diggings.

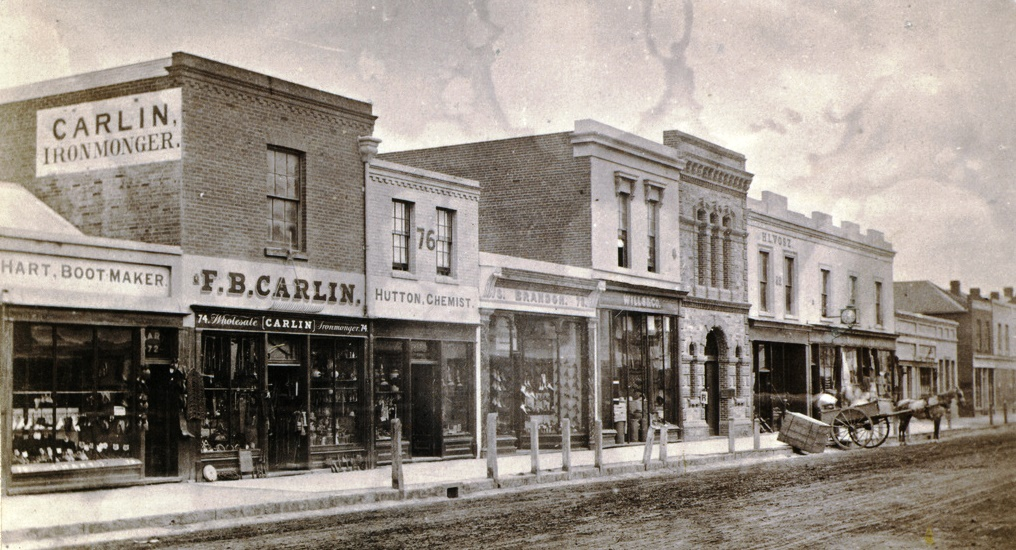
Rundle Street in 1864. Vosz's building has crenelations, verandah

He returned with enough money to set up in business as painter, glazier and paperhanger, and in 1853 opened a retail store at 82 (renumbered c. 1890 as 88) Rundle Street, selling window glass, paints, and wallpaper. The business prospered and he was able to repay, with interest, his creditors back in Germany. The Hamburg Reform of February 1860 published an article noting his integrity, entitled Ein braver Mann.

Vosz maintained an active interest in current events but apart from a few years (1860–1862) as City Councillor, played no active part in public affairs. He died after several years of intense suffering from neuralgia, which no medical treatment could alleviate, and was buried at the West Terrace Cemetery without ostentation, by Rev. J. Crawford Woods. His business had become the largest of its kind in Australia; his wife and sons had predeceased him and much of his considerable fortune was left to local charities, including £2,000 for the Home for Incurables. Other charities to benefit were The Orphan Home, the Royal Institution for the Blind, the Fund of Benevolence of the Grand Lodge of Freemasons of South Australia, the Benevolent Fund of the Irish Constitution of Freemasons of South Australia, the Adelaide Children's Hospital, and the Cottage Homes.

=== Other interests ===
- Vosz established a summer residence, dubbed "Magpie Castle" overlooking the town of Lobethal. After an outbreak of phylloxera, which ruined their vineyards, Vosz and Henry Schmidt established a glue works and tannery in the town.
- He was a director of Provincial Gas Company of South Australia

=== Family ===
Vosz was married to Friederike Dorothea Sophie Vosz, possibly née Hoerber ( – 3 June 1875); they had two sons, both born in Germany:

- Wilhelm Hartwig Eduard Vosz (c. 1840 – 9 August 1883) lawyers were still debating his will 43 years later.
- Adolph Friedrich Emil Vosz (c. 1842 – 14 March 1868)

== Business continues under the Vosz name ==
By Vosz's will, ownership of the business passed to his employees who, through their trustees, sold the business to Johann Heinrich Nicholaus "Henry" Schmidt and Theodore J. C. Hantke (1835–1912), both of whom previously held executive positions in the company.

Schmidt became insolvent in 1894 as a result of his purchase of a large share of the company and inability to realise on property which had lost value. He retired from the partnership and sold his share to businessman Alfred Wilkinson (1863–1922).

In 1904, when the business was registered as a Company, he stepped down as manager to take a position on the board of directors. A. E. Clarkson, who joined the company in 1890, was elected manager and secretary.

In 1899 a leadlight and stained glass department was added, which by the 1920s employed 26 staff and two artist/designers. Adelaide's churches were the high-profile end of the market, but much of their business would have been in advertising windows and mirrors for hotels, and decorative windows and panels for more affluent home-owners.

By 1900 the business owned the area bounded by Rundle Street, Charles Street and Fisher Place, as well as stables and yards on Gilles Street, and also occupied several warehouse on Maclaren Wharf, Port Adelaide. Paints and calcimines, were manufactured at Rundle Street, mirrors were silvered and bevelled, stained glass painted and fired by J. F. Williams and his staff, leadlight windows built up, and plate glass cut and curved. Besides glass of every description, the showroom had a range of gas and electric lighting and heating fittings on display.

The company became H. L. Vosz Ltd in 1901. In 1904 the firm was incorporated with a nominal capital of £50,000. One of the company's first decisions was to divest itself of its building and contracting work, and concentrate on retail. Many of the workers and apprentices who lost their jobs prospered as independent contractors.

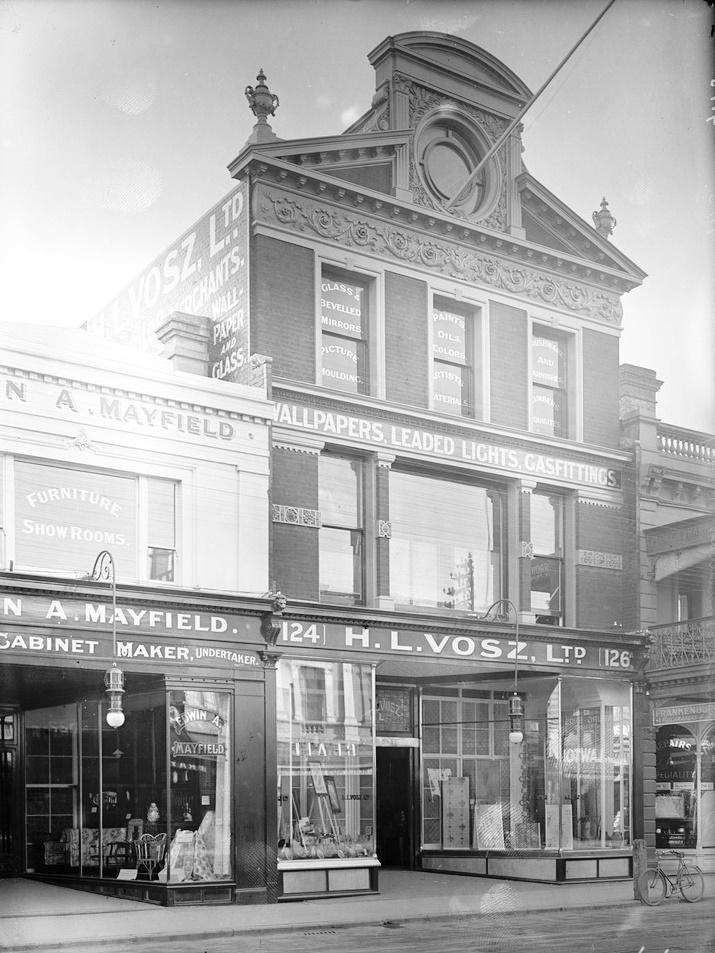
Vosz 124-126 Rundle Street 1908

Around January 1907 manufacture of paints was transferred to purpose-built facilities at Lipson Street, Port Adelaide, and much new equipment brought in. Even so, their Rundle Street showrooms, office and glass workshops were seriously overcrowded, and in July 1908 a new building was opened at 124–126 Rundle Street, alongside the Plough and Harrow Hotel (twenty years later demolished and replaced with the Richmond Hotel) and almost directly opposite the Adelaide Arcade. The shop boasted all the latest decorative styles and innovations in display and efficiency, such as the Lamson cash carriers, and a network of telephones connecting the various offices and workshops. A wide stairway led to the first floor, where displays of lighting and lavatory fittings, leaded lights, stained glass, and other window styles were shown to best effect against the large southern window. Around the walls were displayed church windows and racks with thousands of sample rolls of wallpaper. The basement carried a large stock of plumbers' requirements. Another city block was purchased to house the mirror surfacing and bevelling factory, glass store and cutting workshop.

== Clarkson Limited ==
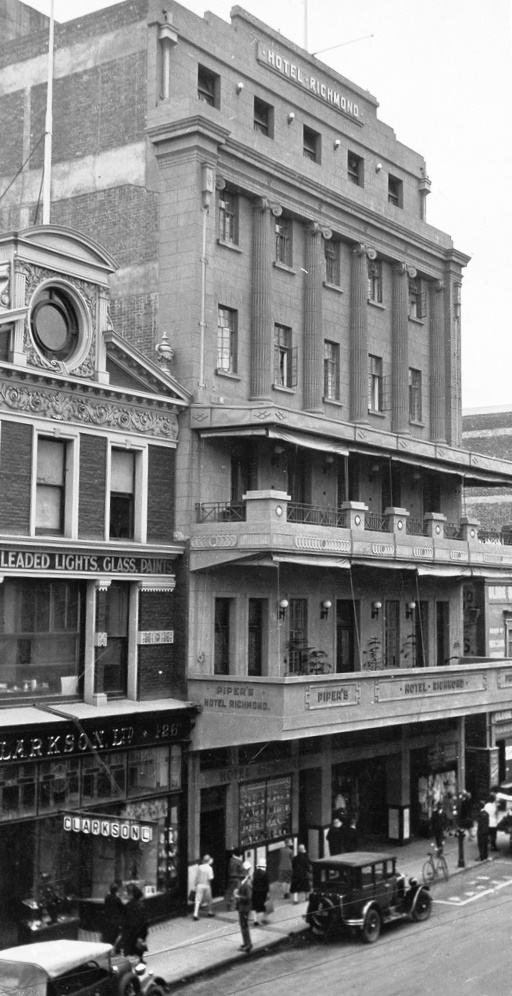
Clarkson's and Hotel Richmond 1929

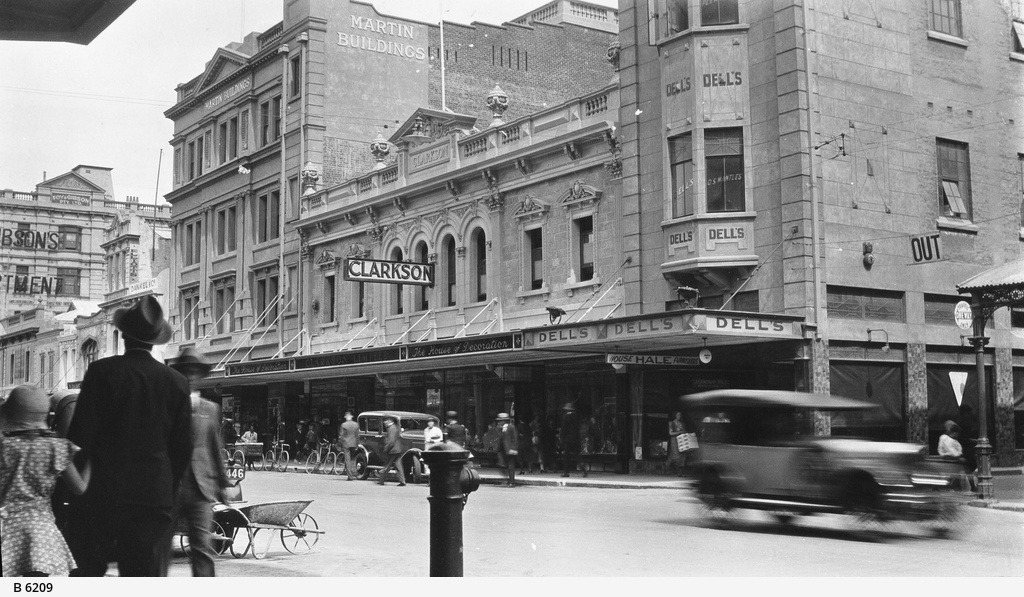
Clarkson Ltd, 135-139 Rundle St., Adelaide

The name of the company was changed to "Clarkson Limited" at an extraordinary general meeting in August 1915, at a time of heightened antipathy to Germanic names. Albert Ernest Clarkson (10 April 1876 – 26 April 1936) was a majority shareholder in the company and its first manager and secretary. He led the company for some 40 years.

In 1912 the Australasian United Paint Company, Limited. was formed with an office in Lipson Street, Port Adelaide and capital £100,000 to take over the paint business of H. L. Vosz Ltd. as a going concern. Its first directors were George Henry Prosser, Albert Ernest Clarkson, James Montague Sandy, Robert Cochrane, and Robert S. Exton.

In December 1932, Clarkson's remodelled the Kithers Buildings at 135–139 Rundle Street, leaving the facade, and this became the new Clarkson's showrooms.

In 1908 the company had purchased property on the north side of Grenfell Street (146–156) alongside the Hotel Grenfell (later Boar's Head) east of Hindmarsh Square, where they later established a Bulk Store, Trade Depot, and offices. In 1958 their Head Office was relocated to 150 Grenfell Street, and featured a 90 feet (27 m) window. The company moved out of plumbing and much of the retail market and in 1958 sold the Rundle Street building to the Commonwealth Bank.

== Stained-glass artists with H. L. Vosz / A. E. Clarkson Ltd ==
- James Ferguson Williams (1877–1959), joined the company in 1899 and was a director 1922–1948 or later. He was a son of Edward and Marion Williams (née Ferguson).
- Alfred James Quarrell (1876–1940), was with the company c. 1914–1918
- Nora Burden was a glass artist with Clarkson Ltd. in the 1930s.

=== Major works from the Vosz studio ===
- Side windows of the council chamber, Adelaide Town Hall, donated by A. M. Simpson. The centre window is attributed to E. F. Troy (see below).
- Church of the Good Shepherd, Bowden, window facing Drayton Street, dedicated to a soldier killed in South Africa.
- Porch windows, Presbyterian Church, Mount Gambier
- Memorial to Mercy Jeffries, wife of Rev. W. H. Jeffries, in the Kent Town Methodist church and the Lathlean window in the same church, artist J. F. Williams.
- The oriel windows on the north of the School of Mines and Industries building opened in 1903 on the Frome Road corner of North Terrace, depicting (apart from various armorial devices and emblems) British scientists and engineers Watt, Newton, Stephenson, Bessemer, Kelvin, Faraday, Wren and Dalton. The windows at the south end of the great Brookman Hall on the first floor of the building were also products of the firm, all from designs by J. F. Williams.
- Windows in the porch of the Keyneton Congregational church, donated by Mrs H. Angas Evans, in memory of their son, H. Lindsay Evans
- A window in St. Columba's Church, Hawthorn, depicting the death of Lazarus
- Colton memorial window in Pirie Street Methodist church depicting Moses at the foot of Mt Sinai and Dorcas feeding the poor
- Twelve windows around The Church of the Immaculate Conception, Port Adelaide, and one in the porch relevant to the Carmelite Order.
- All Saints' Church, Hindmarsh, unveiled by Archdeacon Dove.
- Window for the Mount Pleasant Presbyterian church was delayed due to a shortage of artists.
- Three-light window for St Alban's Church, Gladstone, the work of J. F. Williams
- Lloyd memorial window, Archer Street Wesleyan church, North Adelaide
- A window for St Raphael's (Catholic) Church, Parkside depicting the Blessed Virgin Mary This order was followed by a pair of windows depicting St Patrick and St Brigid Another two, depicting archangels Raphael and Gabriel followed a few years later.
- Four windows in Methodist Ladies' College, Wayville representing "Literature", "Art", "Poetry", and "Music"
- The Nativity and The Crucifixion at All Saints' Anglican Church, Hindmarsh, 1909, memorializing Canon Pollitt and Andrew Guthrie, a long-serving Sunday-school teacher. The source of the centrepiece, The Ascension has not yet been found.
- Caldwell memorial windows in the Presbyterian Church, Mount Gambier, depicting "Light of the World" and "The Good Shepherd".
- Lathlean memorial window for the Kent Town Methodist Church
- Wellington memorial window for the Bordertown Methodist church
- Heath memorial window for the North Rhine Congregational Church, Keyneton, depicting "Jesus and the children"
- Smyth memorial window, Christ Church, Strathalbyn, a figure representing "Faith"
- Caw memorial window, St Mary's church, Kooringa, an interpretation of Holman Hunt's Light of the World
- Memorial windows to Father Bannon and Donald MacLean for St Laurence's (Catholic) church, Buxton-street, North Adelaide consisting of three two-light tracery windows, each 12 feet (3.7 m) high, depicting saints of the Dominican Order, possibly their most ambitious project to that date.

Two windows in the nave of St Peter's Cathedral were installed by the Vosz company, but were from the London firm of Charles Eamer Kempe. One memorializes Dean Marryat and the other, contributed by the children of the church, is a representation of St Hilda.

== Other stained-glass makers of Adelaide ==
- William Montgomery (2 November 1850 – 5 July 1927) was a stained-glass artist who had worked for Clayton & Bell and for eight years worked as a stained-glass designer in Munich. In 1887 he arrived in Melbourne, where he established a successful workshop at 164 Flinders Street. In 1892 his associate Herbert Grimbly arrived in Adelaide to set up a branch office, styled Montgomery & Grimbly, in Peel Street, moving the following year to 20 Waymouth Street, later to Genders Buildings, Grenfell Street. They predate the Vosz company's stained-glass studio by a few years, but ceased production around 1905, closed in 1910. Their work included windows for:

- St Francis Xavier's Cathedral, Wakefield Street, depicting St Patrick and St Laurence and presented by Archbishop Reynolds to honor Bishop Geoghegan and Bishop Laurence Sheil.
- South Australian Museum
- Our Lady's Chapel, Dominican Priory in Molesworth Street, North Adelaide, depicting the Annunciation, 1893.
- South Australian Hotel, 1894
- St Peter's Cathedral
- St Thomas's, Port Lincoln
- St John's, Salisbury
- East window, St Paul's church, Pulteney Street
- North transept, Christ Church, North Adelaide
- Memorial window to Bishop Short in St Peter's College chapel

- E. F. Troy (c. 1855–1910) painter and decorator of 67 Flinders Street and Gawler Place, a Catholic layman remembered as a founder of St. Vincent de Paul in Adelaide. produced much of the art glass found in the villas of affluent Adelaide in the 1890s and early 20th century. He had a very small staff and is believed to have engaged artists to fulfil contracts as they arose.

One such, a Scotsman named R. Elliott designed the northern windows for the School of Mines' Brookman Hall. Dubbed the Empire Window and featuring Edward VII and Queen Alexandra, they were installed in 1902. He was also responsible for the Coronation Window in the council chamber, Adelaide Town Hall, presented by A. M. Simpson.
His foremost artist was Herbert Moesbury Smyrk (1862–1947), born in Guildford, Surrey, and emigrated to Melbourne, where he entered into a partnership with one Charles Rogers as Smyrk & Rogers, stained glass artists, dissolved in September 1888. Smyrk then moved to Adelaide, where he was active in the Adelaide Easel Club and responsible for some of Adelaide's finest locally-produced glass art. Smyrk left for London around March 1898, but a year later his imminent return to Australia was reported. He was a world traveller with a special fondness for Tahiti. In later years he used "Herbert Moesbury" as his full name. His known works include:
- Two windows for St Ignatius' church in Norwood,
- The west windows in the Congregational Church at Keyneton, in memory of Henry Evans and Mrs. S. Lindsay Evans, donated by her brother J. H. Angas, were attributed to Troy, while those in the porch came from the Vosz studio.
- Fruits of the Earth for the original St Augustine's Church, Unley.
- The east window for St George's (Anglican) church in Gawler.
The swimmer and Olympic high-diver Harold Nelson Smyrk was his son.

- Charles Edward Tute (1858 – 4 November 1927), a student of Charles Eamer Kempe, was in Australia 1906–1927, of which less than ten years, perhaps as little as three, was spent in Adelaide, with a studio in Waymouth Street, where his devotional works include:

- windows for the Church of St George in Goodwood, unveiled April 1909
- window in the northern wall of St Paul's Church, Pulteney Street, Adelaide in memory of (Blanche) Ada Bonython (1881–1908), unveiled July 1909
- window in St Columba's church, Hawthorn donated by a Miss or Mrs O'Brien, in memory her mother, unveiled July 1911
- window in the Church of England at Jamestown, unveiled July 1914

He also designed Christmas cards and a reredos for the Church of St Augustine in Unley. He died in Brisbane.
