= Alfred Simpson (ironmaster) =

English ironmaster

Alfred Simpson (1805 – 23 September 1891) was an English iron worker who emigrated to South Australia and founded A. Simpson & Son, a major manufacturing business.

== History ==
Alfred Simpson was born on 29 August 1805 at 139 Leadenhall Street, London, a son of John Simpson and his wife Anne, née Salter, daughter of a Boston sea-captain. The second youngest of their twelve children, he was at 15 apprenticed to Amos Burkitt as a tinplate worker, and in his spare time learned all he could of science and engineering. At the end of his indentures he was admitted to the Worshipful Company of Tinplate Workers and in May 1829 became a Freeman of the City of London.

There being little work for an ironworker at the time, he joined his brother Tom in the tailoring firm of Paine & Simpson as a traveller. Silk hats had just become fashionable, and Alfred was sent to Paris to learn as much as he could about their fabrication. He made some improvements, took out a patent, and soon their company was one of the six largest hat makers in London, employing some 200 men. The prosperity of Simpson's business was checked by a fire (the factory at Southwark was not insured) and it took seven years of hard work before he was sufficiently affluent to marry.

This was the period of the great railway boom, and in the depression following its collapse the demand for silk hats evaporated. Alfred suffered rheumatism, which was exacerbated by England's cold winters, and he decided to emigrate to South Australia where, it was said, the sun always shone and a bright energetic man could make a fortune. Another attraction may have been South Australia's reputation for religious tolerance (Alfred was a Unitarian). He paid off all his creditors and left for Adelaide with his family aboard the John Woodhall, arriving in January 1849.

Alfred had several unsuccessful business ventures and twice visited the goldfields while Sarah gave piano lessons. He must have been moderately successful, as he sent Sarah 20 oz of gold in March 1852.

In 1853 he turned to tinsmithing, making pots and pans and supplying cans for the Glen Ewin jam factory. In 1862 he leased premises in on the south-west corner of Pirie Street and Gawler Place, Adelaide, which were later rebuilt.

Simpson was an innovator and introduced labour-saving machinery and new products such as fire-proof safes, bedsteads, japanned ware, colonial ovens and gas stoves. He was one of the first members of the South Australian Chamber of Manufactures. Of a retiring disposition, he was esteemed for his commercial ability and consideration to employees.

He died on 23 September 1891 and was buried in the West Terrace Cemetery.

== Family ==
Alfred Simpson (29 August 1805 – 23 September 1891) married Sarah Neighbour ( – 30 December 1874) on 21 June 1838, lived in Kent Town, then Upper Kensington from c.1880. Their family included:

- Sarah Simpson (c. 1840 –1850)
- Catherine Simpson (c. 1841 – 1 May 1917) married Rev. John Crawford Woods BA. (8 April 1831 – 10 May 1906) on 4 January 1882
- Alfred Muller Simpson (4 April 1843 – 28 September 1917) married Catherine Allen ( – 16 October 1887) on 18 October 1871. He married again, to Violet Laura Sheridan ( – 28 June 1921) on 23 August 1888, lived at Young House, Young Street, Parkside from c. 1885. This was once the residence and schoolhouse of John Lorenzo Young.

- Alfred Allen Simpson (15 April 1875 – 27 November 1939) married Janet Doris Hübbe (1887 – 17 December 1950) on 6 January 1910. She was a daughter of educator Edith Agnes Hübbe

- (Alfred) Moxon Simpson (17 November 1910 – 11 November 2001) married Elizabeth Robson Cleland (16 October 1910 – 31 January 2005) on 3 August 1938. Elizabeth was a daughter of Professor J. B. Cleland.

- Frederick Neighbour Simpson (21 May 1877 – 1954) married Myra Louise Wilcox (1887–1966) on 5 April 1910. Myra was a daughter of Joseph Wilcox.
- Sarah Simpson (12 February 1882 – 1957) married Owen Crompton (1875–1923) on 27 September 1904
- Catherine Harriet Simpson (18 June 1884 – ) married Cyril Howard Welch RAMC on 31 May 1920
- Katie Allen Simpson (7 October 1887 – 1965) married "cousin" Leonard Charles Simpson (c. May 1877 – 3 July 1953) in 1915, lived at 21 Rochester street, Leabrook. Lieut. L. C. Simpson has been described as a cousin, but the relationship is more distant. His father was Walter Peacock Simpson (11 December 1826 – 17 December 1918), a Victorian MLC (1886–1889), whose parents were Henry Simpson and Elizabeth Peacock.

His only sister Caroline Simpson ( – 27 October 1873) married Thomas Neighbour, lived in Middlesex
