= Marval (disambiguation) =

Marval is a French commune.

Marval may also refer to:

== Companies ==
- Marval (publisher), French publishing house

== People ==
- Adolphe Emile Marval (c. 1845–1935), French-born teacher and art dealer in South Australia
- Alice Marval, (1865–1904), English doctor and nurse in Cawnpore (presently Kanpur, India)
- Jacqueline Marval, real name Marie Josephine Vallet (1866-1932), French artist
- Rocky Marval (born Rocco Marvaldi in 1965), American skater
