= Wattle Park, South Australia =

Wattle Park
- Suburb
- Country: Australia
- State: South Australia
- City: Adelaide
- LGA: City of Burnside

Population
  - Total: 1,885 (SAL 2021)
- Postcode: 5066

Wattle Park is a suburb of Adelaide, South Australia in the City of Burnside.

== History ==
The suburb may have been named by George Scarfe for the property, sections 288 and 289 totalling around 68 acres (28 ha), that he purchased around 1880. His residence, renamed "Scarfe House", became the Wattle Park Teachers College in 1957 until 1972, when its usage and name were changed to the Wattle Park Teachers Centre until sold by the Education Department. In 1991 it became the centrepiece of "Wattle Grove", a retirement village for Southern Cross Homes.

=== Olives ===
The Stonyfell Olive Company was founded by Joseph Crompton with William Mair and Sidney Clark in 1873, with planting continuing until 1882 across Stonyfell and adjoining areas. By the 1900 had a 100 acres (40 ha) planted with about 10,000 olive trees, around Penfold Road. In 1901, the company employed 81 workers. This business became largely owned by the family of Owen Crompton (1875–1923) after his marriage to Sarah Simpson, daughter of A. M. Simpson, who settled on her the whole of his considerable stake in the company. With the inexorable expansion of Adelaide's suburbs, the land was sold to developers. The olive crushing plant was actually in what is now Wattle Park, at the western end of Crompton Drive. In August 1932, the Stonyfell Olive Company was the largest producer of olive oil in South Australia, and it entered into an agreement with Bickford's to do the bottling of the oil.

=== Post office ===
Wattle Park Post Office opened on 8 April 1965 and closed in 1967.

== Facilities ==
There are no schools in Wattle Park. The closest school to Wattle Park is St Peter's Collegiate Girls' School in Stonyfell. Other schools nearby are Norwood Morialta High School (Senior Campus) and Magill Primary School in Magill.

Wattle Park Kindergarten, formerly named Christopher Rawson Penfold Kindergarten after Christopher Rawson Penfold, is located on Yeltana Avenue.
