= Wattle Park =

Wattle Park may refer to:

- Wattle Park, Melbourne, a park in Victoria, Australia
- Wattle Park, South Australia, a suburb of Adelaide
