= Independent Girls' Schools Sports Association (South Australia) =

The Independent Girls' Schools Sports Association of South Australia (IGSSA) is a group of independent schools in South Australia involved in a variety of sporting and cultural activities. As of 2025, it has 10 member schools.

== Current member schools ==
School	Location	Enrolment	Founded	Denomination	Boys/Girls	Day/Boarding	School Colors
Concordia College	Highgate	700	1890	Lutheran	Boys & Girls	Day	Navy and gold
Immanuel College	Novar Gardens	800	1895	Lutheran	Boys & Girls	Day & Boarding	Navy, gold and white
Pembroke School	Kensington Park	1545	1915	Non-denominational	Boys & Girls	Day & Boarding	Blue, green and gold
Pulteney Grammar School	Adelaide	820	1847	Anglican	Boys & Girls	Day	Blue, white and red
St Peter's Collegiate Girls' School	Stonyfell	550	1894	Anglican	Girls	Day	Navy and white
Scotch College	Mitcham	850	1919	Uniting Church	Boys & Girls	Day & Boarding	Navy and gold
Seymour College	Glen Osmond	765	1922	Uniting Church	Girls	Day & Boarding	Green, navy and purple
Walford Anglican School for Girls	Hyde Park	650	1893	Anglican	Girls	Day & Boarding	Blue, light blue and gold
Westminster School	Marion	1100	1961	Uniting Church	Boys & Girls	Day & Boarding	Green
Wilderness School	Medindie	820	1884	Non-denominational	Girls	Day & Boarding	Brown and light blue

== Sports ==
- Athletics
- Badminton
- Basketball
- Hockey
- Netball
- Soccer
- Softball
- Swimming
- Tennis
- Volleyball

== See also ==
- List of schools in South Australia
- Independent Schools Sports Association (South Australia)
