= Mary Maydwell Martin =

Australian bookseller

Mary Maydwell Martin (20 July 1915 - 25 January 1973) was an Australian bookseller, founder of the Mary Martin Bookshop.

== History ==
Martin was born in Adelaide to Ernest Montgomerie Martin AMIEE. (1878–1956) and his wife Lorna Gledstanes Martin, née Jacob, (1889–1973), both associated with the Unitarian Christian Church of Wakefield Street. Ernest was a son of vigneron Henry Maydwell Martin and nephew of Anna Montgomerie Martin; Lorna lost two brothers in The Great War; a third was awarded the Military Medal for bravery and later hounded for his Communist sympathies. Educator Caroline Jacob (1861–1940) was a great-aunt.

In 1945 she founded the Mary Martin Book Shop on Grenfell Street, Adelaide. In 1947 she asked Max Harris to become a partner in the shop, which by then had moved to Alma Chambers, 13 Commercial Place. Harris agreed; he also made a news-sheet which he called Mary's Own Paper, although it contained his own opinions. The shop expanded, and by 1955 it was located at 75 Rundle Street; by 1957 it was in a large part of the first floor of the Da Costa Building, Gawler Place. In 1962 Mary decided to move to India for good, having previously visited there in 1952, 1957, and 1961. Harris became the sole manager of the bookshop, and Mary sold her interests in the firm to him and Yvonne Harris.

After living in Bombay for a time, Mary moved to Bangalore and established an Indian mail-order book business. Her sister Florence managed the finances from Australia. She also sold local arts and crafts to Community Aid Abroad. She hired T. R. Kesavamurthy as a servant, training him to become the manager of her book business. In 1965 she and Kesavamurthy moved to Kotagiri, where she hoped the climate would be good for her asthma. There, in addition to her work with books, she volunteered with the Nilgiris Adivasi Welfare Association. She was appointed the association's honorary treasurer, and wrote its Newsletter.

A dispensary at Balwadi, India, was named after her, and a memorial fund to continue her welfare work was established in Adelaide, Australia.

The Mary Martin chain was sold to Macmillans in the late 1970s. As of 1998 there were four Mary Martin bookshops in Australia, and the Kesavamurthy family ran Mary Martin Booksellers from Coimbatore, India. Mary Martin Booksellers continues now with their Head Office in Singapore.

Mary was also a foundation member of the South Australian branch of the Contemporary Art Society of Australia, and in 1939 won the Tormore prize for English Literature.
