= Arthur Noyes =

Arthur Noyes may refer to:

- Arthur Amos Noyes (1866–1936), American chemist, inventor and educator
- Arthur Noyes (organist) (1862–1929), church organist in South Australia
- Arthur Percy Noyes (1880–1963), psychiatric administrator and educator
- Arthur H. Noyes (1853–1915), U.S. federal judge
