= H. M. Martin and Son =

Australian winegrower

H. M. Martin and Son was a South Australian winemaking company based at Stonyfell in the Adelaide Hills.

== History ==
Henry Maydwell "Harry" Martin (1846–1936) was a son of Edward Montgomrey Martin (1807–1894) who, with his wife Ann (née Thornton) (1809–1901) and their family migrated to South Australia from England on the Anglia, arriving at Port Adelaide on 5 March 1851. He was educated at J. L. Young's Adelaide Educational Institution, and started work as secretary and accountant for Stonyfell Wines, which had been founded by Henry Septimus Clark (1836–1864) around 1860 and largely managed by his brother-in-law Joseph Crompton. Harry learned much of the art and science of winemaking from Henry Tyler, Crompton's cellar manager, and when, in the economic depression of 1884, the business was taken over by the Bank of Adelaide, leased then sold to quarry operator Henry Dunstan (1841 – 22 May 1915), Harry was taken on as his accountant, and purchased Crompton's house "Ilfracombe" on Stonyfell Road in 1888. In 1902 Harry took on his younger son Ronald, who had recently graduated from Roseworthy Agricultural College and leased the vineyards and cellars from Dunstan, and in 1934 purchased the property from the Dunstan estate, having in 1926 set up the company H. M. Martin and Son to purchase their business and provide working capital. Harry died two years later and Ronald became chairman of directors, with his cousin (Wilfred Francis) Darwin Clark (1892–1943) in charge of the cellars and vineyards. They took over the "Metala" vineyards of Langhorne Creek and W. Salter's vineyards in Angaston.

Ronald was killed in 1950 when the car in which he was a passenger overturned near Bordertown. Michael Auld (grandson of Patrick Auld) became managing director, succeeded in 1962 by Ronald's son Henry Maydwell Martin II. In 1972 the company was taken over by Dalgety Australia, and by 1978 by Seagram's, at which time the winemaking part of the business at Stonyfell was wound up. Since then the vineyards at Stonyfell, which covered 70 acres (28 ha), have mostly been taken over for housing.

== Family ==
Edward Montgomrey Martin (26 January 1807 – 3 June 1894), a first cousin of James Montgomrey of Brentford, married Ann Thornton (12 October 1809 – 31 July 1901) on 6 June 1835. The family travelled to South Australia on the Anglia, arriving 5 March 1851

- James Edward Martin (13 September 1837 – 26 September 1892) married Ann "Annie" Goodman (ca.1830 – 17 November 1872) on 28 April 1866. solicitor
- Lucy Martin (26 August 1839 – 3 May 1863) married John Howard Clark (15 January 1830 – 20 May 1878) on 15 October 1858
- Anna "Annie" Montgomerie Martin (8 November 1841 – 9 August 1918) headmistress Miss Martin's School; scholarship at Adelaide University named for her. Later headmistresses were Caroline "Cara" Clark (1875–1924), J. Moncrieff.
- Mary Jane "Pollie" Martin (14 July 1845 – 12 July 1943) married James Arthur Whitfield (19 June 1840 – 31 January 1873) on 27 April 1871
- Henry Maydwell "Harry" Martin (25 December 1846 – 25 September 1936) married (Ellen) Rosa Clark (28 September 1838 – 28 October 1899) on 6 August 1874. Ellen was a daughter of Edward Montgomrey Martin's good friend Francis Clark (1799–1853) and his wife Caroline (1800–1877) née Hill. Among their children were:

- Emily Rosa Martin (29 September 1875 – 27 January 1960) married Frank Robert Burden (2 July 1877 – 2 September 1960) on 26 December 1903. Their daughter Nora Burden (24 May 1908 – 25 December 1992) was a stained glass artist; several of her devotional and memorial windows survive in Adelaide churches. Another daughter Margaret Eleanor "Peg" Burden (12 April 1917 – 22 August 2007) married Donald Alexander "Don" Dowie (1917–2016), brother of John Dowie. They were parents of painter Helen "Penny" Dowie (born 3 August 1948).
- Ernest Montgomerie Martin A.M.I.E.E. (22 April 1878 – 30 April 1956) married Lorna Gledstanes Jacob (4 December 1889 – 22 May 1973) on 27 September 1913. Ernest, an electrical engineer, joined Ellis and Clark (another connection with the Clark family) in 1909, was major shareholder in H. M. Martin and Son. He and Lorna were the parents of Mary Maydwell Martin.
- Ronald Henry Martin (7 September 1880 – 27 March 1950) married Hilda Mildmay Landseer (1 June 1882 – 13 June 1974) on 20 February 1912. Ronald was killed in a car crash near Bordertown.

- Ruth Landseer Martin (1913–1996) married Alan Cowling in 1938.
- Katherine Landseer Martin (1916– ) married Dr. John Gardner McGlashan in 1943.
- Henry Maydwell Martin II (1919–1988) married Elaine Blair Good in 1947.

- Frederick "Fred" Martin (9 April 1848 – 27 April 1909) married writer Catherine Edith Macauley Mackay (1847 – 15 March 1937) home "Melness", Hackney
- Euphemia "Effie" Martin (9 October 1849 – 29 August 1874) married Matthew Symonds Clark (19 January – 11 July 1920) on 29 August 1874

== See also ==
- Francis Clark and Sons

== Sources ==
- The Martin/Clark Book Committee The Hatbox Letters, Published by the authors, Adelaide, 1999. ISBN 0-646-36207-0
- Bishop, Geoffrey C. The Vineyards of Adelaide, Lynton Publications Pty. Ltd. 1977 ISBN 0-86946-280-6
