= John Howard Clark =

South Australia newspaper editor (1830–1878)

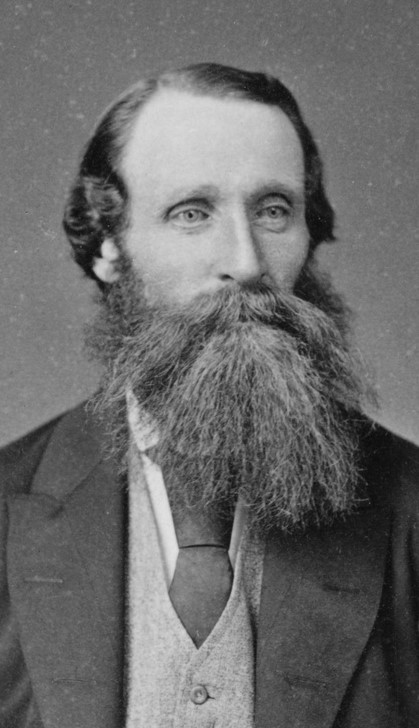
- Born: 15 January 1830
- Died: 20 May 1878
- Education: King's College London
- Occupation: Newspaper editor

John Howard Clark (15 January 1830 – 20 May 1878) was editor of The South Australian Register from 1870 to 1877 and was responsible for its Echoes from the Bush column and closely associated with its Geoffry Crabthorn persona.

== Early years ==
John was born in Birmingham, son of Francis Clark (1799 – 1853), a silversmith also born in Birmingham. Grandfather Thomas Clark ran a school for boys, then a factory.

His mother Caroline (1800 – 16 September 1877) was a daughter of mathematician Thomas Wright Hill (24 April 1763 – 13 June 1851), founder of what became Hazelwood School in Birmingham under her brother Rowland Hill (famous for inventing penny postage and important in South Australian history as the Secretary to the Commissioners for the Colonisation of South Australia). Her eldest brother, Matthew Davenport Hill, was Recorder of Birmingham, penal reformer and a supporter of Edward Gibbon Wakefield.

John was educated at Birmingham and Edgbaston Proprietary School and King's College London, where John Lorenzo Young (later to found the Adelaide Educational Institution) was a fellow student.

== Career ==
Clark worked for a time at an iron smelter in Dudley, but after a bout of serious illness, emigrated with his parents to Adelaide, South Australia, arriving on the Fatima in June 1850. After a short period of work as an assayer, he joined his father as accountant in the firm which, with A. Sidney Clark as proprietor in 1853, became Francis Clark and Sons, hardware importers and shipping agents of Blyth Street. John Howard Clark became one of the colony's most sought-after accountants, as with the 1862 audit of the Duryea mine.

Clark was an adept writer and contributed to the Register (one of those who used the nom de plume "Pleeceman X"), and the Telegraph, an evening paper whose editor, Frederick Sinnett, was a close friend.

In October 1865 Clark purchased a share of the Register and Observer from The Hon. Joseph Fisher (1834–1907), the other proprietors being William Kyffin Thomas and Edward William Andrews. He also took Fisher's place as its commercial manager. He was appointed editor in 1870. (The proprietors at the time of his funeral were William Kyffin Thomas, C. Day, J. H. Finlayson and Robert Kyffin Thomas.)

The seven years of Clark's editorship marked a high point in the history of The Register. According to one commentator "... his well-balanced intellect, his judicially impartial mind, and great knowledge of men and things, stood him in good stead. ... the paper has become a greater power in the state ... not merely for its independence of thought, but for its fearlessness in tho expression of its opinions, and its aim to be at all times fair and just. ... many of his articles upon education and financial questions were very powerful. ... (he was) an ardent disciple of Stuart Mill, and the abolition of not a few of the restrictions upon trade in the colony is in a measure due to his advocacy".

The one aspect of his incumbency for which he is best remembered is the weekly "Echoes from the Bush" column, conducted under the pseudonym "Geoffry Crabthorn" with its frequently powerful advocacy and pungent satire.

"It is understood that he originated (this column). Whether he did or not I am not in a position to say but that he contributed to it some of the best productions of his mind I know full well. The "Echoes" have been read and appreciated in the other colonies – in fact, at this moment I have a letter from one of the ablest writers in Sydney, who says, what we here are prepared to endorse, that "Geoffry Crabthorn" at his best has no peer in Australia."

== Other interests ==
Clark acted as landlord for his uncle Rowland Hill, who owned two parcels of land later the site of by the Parkside Mental Hospital.

Clark was a supporter of the Adelaide Educational Institution and close friend of its founder, John L. Young.

Clark was an active member of the Unitarian Christian Church in Wakefield Street, and prominent in the appointment in 1855 of its first full-time minister, the Rev. John Crawford Woods.

Clark helped found the Adelaide Philosophical Society, and was secretary from its formation in 1853 until 1862. His brother A. Sidney Clark later held that position.

He helped found the South Australian Institute, and was for many years one of its Governors, resigning in 1873 because of ill-health.

In 1860 he joined the South Australian Volunteer Military Force and rose to the rank of Major in 1866. In 1869 he was obliged to decline further promotion because of ill-health. The Volunteer Force was a militia formed in 1855 for the defence of the colony of South Australia.

== Family ==
Most, if not all, of Clark's children were given the middle name "Howard" and he was himself generally referred to as though "Howard Clark" were his surname.

Clark's seven brothers included Algernon Sidney Clark (1826 – 16 February 1908), M(atthew) Symonds Clark (c. 1839 – 10 July 1920), who married Euphemia Martin on 29 August 1874 (and was father of engineer Edward Vincent Clark), and Henry Septimus Clark (died February 1864). His three sisters included (Caroline) Emily Clark (1824–1911) founder, with Catherine Helen Spence, of the "Boarding-out Society", a scheme for finding homes for destitute children and Susan Mary Clark who on 8 May 1866 married Joseph Crompton (1842–1901), who with her brother Henry, founded Stonyfell winery. He married Lucy Martin (26 August 1839 – 3 May 1863) in the Unitarian Church in Wakefield Street on 15 October 1858. (Lucy was a daughter of Edward Montgomrey Martin and Ann née Thornton.) They lived in Hazelwood Cottage (named after the Birmingham school, and commemorated in the present-day suburb of Hazelwood Park.) on Greenhill Road, Knightsbridge.

Lucy gave birth to

- Francis Howard Clark (22 September 1859 – 17 June 1945), a prizewinning student at Adelaide Educational Institution 1871–1876. He married Edith Mary Smith (1861 – 17 July 1950) on 5 June 1890.
- Ellen Howard "Nellie" Clark (30 July 1861 – 4 November 1936) married William George Auld, son of William Patrick Auld, on 12 August 1893.
- Lucy Howard Clark (27 April 1863 – 30 January 1940) married (Anglican) Rev. G(eorge John) Shirreff Bowyear (8 February 1851 – 16 November 1923) on 12 June 1883.

His wife Lucy died 6 days after birth of daughter Lucy. For the following eighteen months his sister Emily lived at the cottage, helping him care for the children. He married again, to Agnes Macnee (ca.1843 – 13 June 1913) on 11 October 1865. She gave birth to

- Marion Howard Clark (15 September 1866 – 1 May 1867)
- Jessie Howard Clark (28 July 1868 – 11 August 1942) married Alfred Barham Black on 24 January 1891. Dorrit Black, a noted modernist painter, was a daughter.
- Arthur Howard Clark (20 December 1869 – 11 June 1947) married Lilly Beviss Cossins on 30 October 1895. He was a manager of the Allandale silver mine at Broken Hill
- Alice (19 July 1871 – 28 April 1874 aged 2 years)
- Rose (14 June 1873 – 7 May 1943) never married
- Florence (10 March 1875 – 15 November 1952) never married

== Last years ==
He had a residence at Port Willunga where he appears to have spent his last years and where he died on 20 May 1878, aged 48, of consumption (tuberculosis).

== Recognition ==
The John Howard Clark Scholarship for English Literature at the University of Adelaide was endowed in his memory, and open to boys or girls who had completed the first year of a BA degree. Initially it was awarded after a special examination, but later judged on the year's work, and later became "The John Howard Clark Prize and Title of John Howard Clark Scholar", and paid in two equal instalments: on completion of the Honours degree and on completion of Master of Philosophy or Doctor of Philosophy. It was first won in 1882, by George Murray who was later, as Sir George, to make his mark as Chief Justice and Chancellor of the University. A. E. V. Richardson, founding director of Waite Institute and later Assistant Director of CSIRO won it in 1907.

Howard Terrace, Hazelwood Park, is named for him.

== Sources ==
- Heaton, J. H. Australian Dictionary of Dates and Men of the Time George Robertson, Sydney 1879
- Mennell, Philip (1892). "Clark, John Howard" . The Dictionary of Australasian Biography. London: Hutchinson & Co – via Wikisource.
