= Annie Montgomerie Martin =

English-Australian Headmistress and suffragist (1841-1918)

- Born: 8 November 1841; Birmingham, England
- Died: 9 August 1918 (aged 76); Rome, Italy
- Occupation: Educator

Anna Montgomerie Martin (Note: The spelling of her middle name is idiosyncratic. Her paternal grandmother (1780–1862) was born Susanna Montgomerey. Her father (1807–1894) was Edward Montgomrey Martin.) (8 November 1841 – 9 August 1918), was a teacher and headmistress who founded Miss Martin's Girls School in Adelaide, Australia. When the University of Adelaide opened, she focussed on preparing her students for higher education, leading to them being among the first women to graduate with degrees. She played an active role in the suffrage movement.

Martin was always known as "Annie", but often signing her name "A. Montgomerie Martin"

== Early life ==
Martin was born in Birmingham, England, the third child and second daughter of Ann Martin née Thornton (1809–1901), and Edward Martin (1807–1894), distantly related to Charles Darwin. She first attended school at Highgate, Birmingham, then in 1850 migrated to Adelaide with her parents on the Anglia, arriving at Port Adelaide on 5 March 1851. The Martins soon met up with Francis Clark and his family, fellow-Unitarians.

The Clarks and the Martins were to have a remarkably close relationship, culminating in four Clarks marrying four Martins. Martin's education continued with Emily Clark as tutor at "Hazelwood", the Clark family home, and Martin in turn acted as tutor to her younger brothers. Her older sister Lucy married the literate Howard Clark, and Martin might have wed Henry Septimus Clark, but she took a long break "home" in England, accompanied by Mrs Susan Woods (wife of J. Crawford Woods) from 1859 to 1861. There she got to know many of her and the Clarks' relatives, including Rowland Hill, Emily Clark's uncle. She visited a workhouse, a lunatic asylum, a boarding school and a jail, as well as taking drawing lessons and other "improving" activities. She probably spent time at Bruce Castle school, run by the Hills; a school where achievement was rewarded but punishment was rare.

Almost immediately after returning to Adelaide, she and Henry Septimus Clark, one of the founders of Stonyfell vineyards and winery, were engaged to be married. The date was set for 18 February 1864, but it turned out to be the day Henry died of tuberculosis, a disease that killed several others of the Clark family.

== Career ==
Martin began her career as a tutor for the children in Adelaide. Subsequently, around 1870, she opened a morning school on the upper floor of a house in Pulteney Street. At first the clients of Miss Martin's School were mostly members of the Adelaide Unitarian Christian Church, but word spread that she was providing a well-rounded education free from dogma (comparable perhaps to John L. Young's Adelaide Educational Institution but co-educational and teaching humanities rather than science, accounting and surveying).

In 1874 the University of Adelaide opened, and from its inception allowed female students, and Miss Martin's School moved its focus to preparation of girls for higher education. The school closed in 1874 (perhaps from a dearth of suitable teachers) and Martin reverted to tutoring in a private residence on Strangways Terrace, North Adelaide, then worked at Mme. Marval's school in Ramsay Building at the corner of North Terrace and Rundle Place (now Gawler Place), tutoring in English and Mathematics. She may then have taught at Miss Senner's school in Barnard Street, North Adelaide. She took another two years off in England 1883–1884, then reopened her school at her home in Osmond Terrace, Norwood, teaching French, German, Italian and Greek. In 1893 she set up school at the corner of Pulteney and Rundle Streets, then on Victoria Square in 1897.

Many of Martin's students did well academically: Edith Cook was, in 1877, the first woman to pass the University's entrance examination. She became a noted educator in her own right, and after the death of her husband supported herself and her family by conducting Mrs Hübbe's School for forty years. Laura Fowler was the first, in 1891, to graduate in medicine. Caroline Clark, a niece, was one of the first women to graduate M.A. from Adelaide University. These, and to a greater extent, graduates of the Advanced School for Girls, were crucial in public acceptance of women's suffrage. Martin played a part in the campaign for the movement, addressing meetings with Mary Lee

== Last years ==
Martin had always been considered a little eccentric – she was little bothered with fashion, and neglected such household chores as cleaning and cooking, but would not, or could not, employ a maid. She was suspicious of modern plumbing, and when sewerage was introduced to the west side of Osmond Terrace, Norwood, where she lived, she moved over the road to No. 12. She was 60 years old when her mother died, and the small inheritance enabled her to indulge in European travel. She left the school in the capable hands of her niece Caroline "Cara" (pronounced "carer") Clark. She settled in Viterbo where, increasingly feeble and with failing eyesight, she lived her last days.

== Obituary ==
"The late Miss Anna Montgomerie Martin, who died in Rome on 9 August, will be remembered by many old pupils, as she founded and carried on for many years one of the leading schools in Adelaide. Her methods of instruction, although successful, were quite unconventional. Miss Martin was of English birth, and arrived in Australia in the early fifties. She was young at the time, but was already imbued with English ideas and sympathies, having been nurtured among those liberal thinkers who took an active part in repealing the corn laws and introducing that freedom of trade which placed a check on the gains of the profiteer, destroyed the unhallowed joys of the smuggler, and has contributed to an accumulation of wealth which is now freely used in the worldwide struggle against despotism. Miss Martin was a student of languages from an early age, and loved to acquire knowledge, as she loved to impart it to others. In the early eighties of last century she helped to build up a prosperous and influential school on North Terrace, Adelaide, then conducted by Mr. Marval and his accomplished wife. In vain did the Education Department tempt her with a high salary and a fine position. Mortified and impoverished by Government competition, Miss Martin returned to her native land, where she made a study of new methods of teaching. Some developments of educational methods met with her strong disfavour. She was always opposed to cramming, forcing, and pushing of the youthful intelligence. Miss Martin returned to Australia in 1884, and established a new school in the very teeth of governmental opposition. She retired finally from the profession about 17 years ago, and since that time she has lived mostly in Italy, the land she loved. So far as she was able, she helped the Italians in their time of trial by supplying poor homeless refugees and others with food and necessaries. She came from a long-lived family. It was probable that the constant demand on her keen sympathy and active help shortened a life that was useful and valuable, even in old age."

== Recognition ==
The Annie Montgomerie Martin Prizes for French and History were inaugurated by the Old Scholars of Miss Martin's School and presented annually to the top student, whether male or female, in the Leaving Examination conducted by Adelaide University.

== Sources ==
- Hardy, Anne; Annie, a chapter in The Hatbox Letters, published by The Martin/Clark Book Committee, Adelaide, 1999 ISBN 0 646 36207 0
