= Nora Burden =

Nora Burden (24 May 1908 – 25 December 1992) was a South Australian stained glass artist.

Burden was born in Adelaide, the eldest daughter of engineer Frank Robert Burden (1877–1960) and Emily Rosa Burden, née Martin, (1875–1960) a daughter of vigneron Henry M. "Harry" Martin. The newly married couple first lived at "Poltalloch" the Bowman property near Meningie, where Frank was responsible for all the machinery. They then moved to suburban Fullarton, where their first four children Charles, Nora, Rosa and Hester were born. Frank served with the First AIF in France and by war's end had been promoted to captain. He was briefly chief engineer with Tarrants and Autocars vehicle builders in Melbourne then in 1922 founded, with Sidney Crawford and L. M. Anderson, Adelaide Motors, South Australia's first Fiat agency. He later acquired the South Australian agency for the John Deere tractor company,

Burden studied painting at the S.A. School of Arts and Crafts and began working as a stained glass artist for A. E. Clarkson Ltd., an old established Adelaide glass firm, which was then on Rundle Street.

She served as tutor and mentor to South Australian stained glass artist Vanessa Smith née Lambe (1917–2005), whose work adorns many Anglican churches in South Australia. She worked for a time in Sydney and Melbourne before returning to Adelaide. She served as Art Mistress at Annesley College.

Burden married Dimiter Petroff (25 March 1915 – 28 January 1997) on 30 April 1954; they had no children. She was an aunt of painter Helen "Penny" Dowie (born 3 August 1948).

== Selected works ==
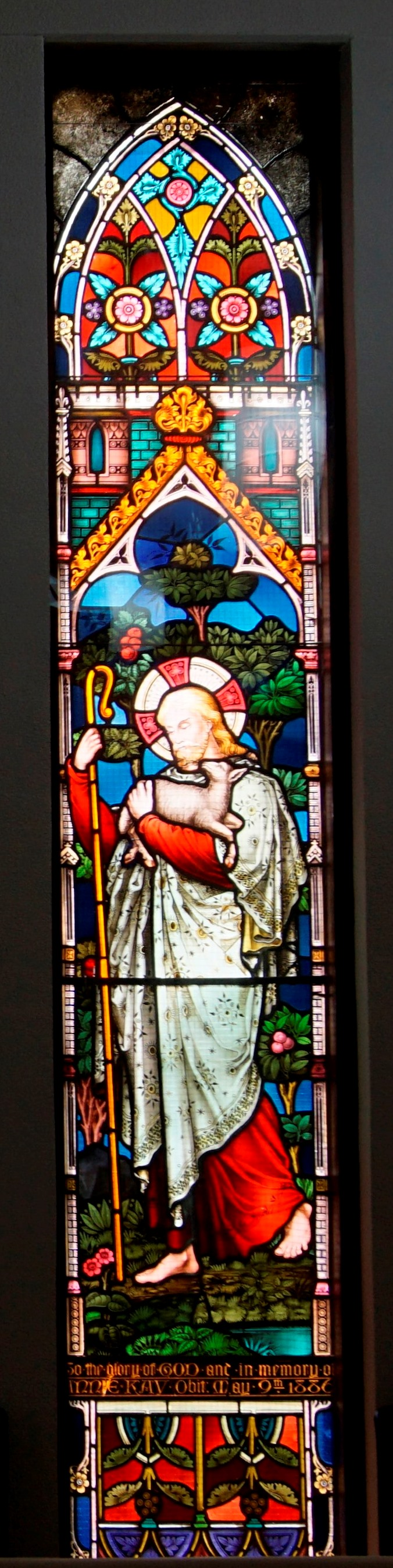
The Good Shepherd

- A window in the porch, St. Ignatius Catholic Church, corner Queen and William Streets, Norwood, South Australia commemorates their long-serving (1902–1929) organist Arthur Noyes.
- A window, depicting the Parable of the Good Samaritan was installed in the Adelaide Unitarian Christian Church, Wakefield Street, Adelaide as a memorial to Symonds and Euphemia Clark. It was funded by a provision in the will of their son W. F. Darwin Clark (1892–1943), a Red Cross volunteer who died in sinking of hospital ship AHS Centaur. It was transferred to the Unitarian Church's new building in Norwood in the early 1970s.
- A window at Uniting Church, Malvern, South Australia, "Christian Soldier" in memory of James Montrose Maughan and his wife Marjorie Wallace.Flickr photo
