= Caroline Emily Clark =

South Australian social reformer

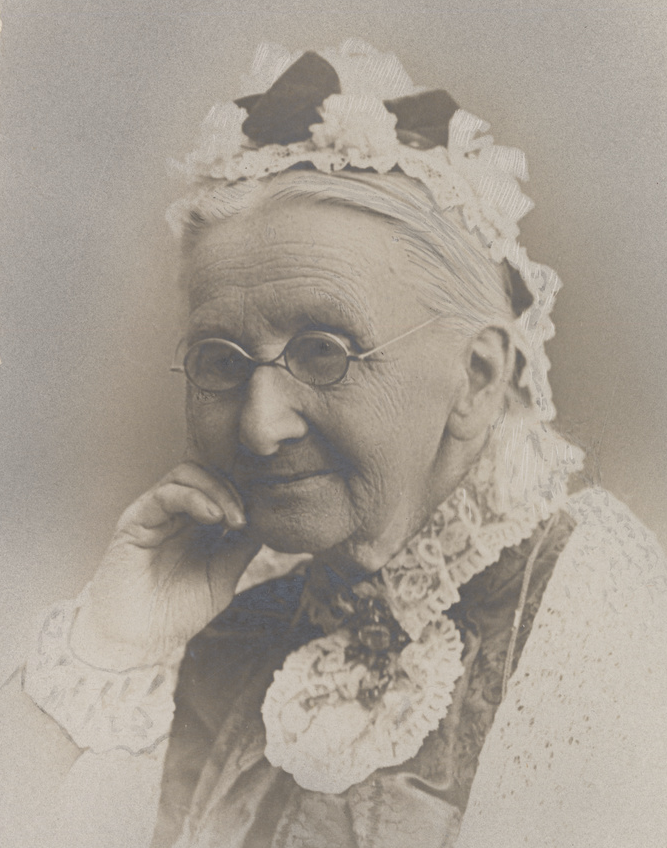
- Born: Birmingham
- Occupation: Social worker, social reformer
- Works: child welfare

Caroline Emily Clark (6 September 1825 – 18 November 1911), invariably known as Emily Clark, was a South Australian social reformer well known for championing the cause of children in institutions and founding the "boarding-out system" for settling orphan children with foster families in Adelaide.

She was born in Birmingham, England, one of the children of Francis Clark, a silversmith of Birmingham, and his wife Caroline, a sister of Rowland Hill. A delicate child with poor eyesight, she was an apt and industrious student like her brother Howard. In 1837 she was sent to stay with her grandmother Hill in Tottenham, half a mile from Bruce Castle, to study at "Miss Woods School" in a nearby town, perhaps Upper Clapton. Around 1840 scarlet fever struck the family and Emily was left with rheumatism in her hands.

The family settled in Adelaide, South Australia in 1850.

In 1863, shortly after the death of brother Howard's wife Lucy, Emily joined him in his newly built "Hazelwood Cottage" (a few hundred metres from the original "Hazelwood Homestead") to care for his three young children: Frank, Nellie and new-born Lucy, and stayed there until Howard's marriage to Agnes McNee in 1865.

== Public life ==
The next phase of her life, for which she is best remembered, arose from her friendship with fellow-Unitarian Annie Montgomerie Martin, who had visited Adelaide's Destitute Asylum, a State-run institution for children abandoned by their parents on account of poverty, and been shocked at the hopelessness of its occupants. Emily had seen in Scotland the virtues of having these unfortunates rather raised amongst working families (and perhaps influenced by her cousin Rosamond Davenport Hill), broached the subject in the Register, which prompted favourable editorial comment and extended the debate to the Orphan Girls' Home. It is likely that her brother Howard, a proprietor of the Register, was behind these editorials.

Emily argued that housing them together perpetuated their feelings of hopelessness and worthlessness and was unlikely to develop them into productive citizens, and it was, moreover, expensive. There were, at the time, two State bodies concerned with the welfare of uncared-for children: the Children's Apprenticeship Board (formed in 1848) and the Destitute Board, which since 1867 ran a form of poorhouse in the "Grace Darling" (previously a temperance hotel) in Brighton, followed by a new orphanage in Magill in 1869. Emily's aim was to replace these with a less bureaucratic system that sent these children to live in the homes of working families, no more than four together, and preferably away from the city. The families would receive adequate recompense, but the overall cost would not be substantially higher than the warehousing of the children. Despite influential support from Catherine Helen Spence, John Howard Clark, C. B. Young, Margaret Fraser (later Lady) Davenport (1821–1902) and Mary (later Lady) Colton (1822–1898), the government refused to put any of her ideas into operation, but did permit her "Boarding-out Society" to engage in trials. Neville Blyth organised for her to have responsibility for a boy and a girl who were unhappy in the institution.

She was appointed to the State Children's Council on 9 December 1886.

She appears to have been invited by the State of Victoria in 1902 to advise on welfare of orphan and destitute children, especially babies of unmarried girls with no family support.

== Retirement ==
She retired from the State Children's Council, mainly due to her deafness, on 13 August 1906. Her sister Mary Crompton had done much useful work on the boarding-out committee and succeeded her on the State Children's Council in 1906.

Catherine Spence wrote the book "State Children in Australia" about the work of Emily Clark, and it was published by the State Children's Council in recognition of her service. Miss Spence wrote:-"In other English speaking countries boarding-out in families is sometime permitted, but here, under the Southern Cross, it is the law of the land that children shall not be brought up in institutions but in homes. This movement originated in South Australia, and with all its far-reaching developments and expansion it is due to the initiative of one woman, of whom the State and the Commonwealth are justly proud – Miss C. E. Clark."

In her last years she was infirm and almost totally blind, but she retained much of her fierce intellect. A late poem, published in The Register, can be quoted here:

All-healing Death! Thou art not far away.
Time bears thee onwards with unflagging wings –
Nearer and nearer coming day by day
To break the tangled web that round me clings
The web of life with many glittering strings;
So bright and beautiful, I fain would stay
In this fair world, but darkness and decay
Creep at the heels of age, and earthly things
Their savour lose: so may I glad obey
Thy stern command, that ease and solace brings
With gentle sleep, the strife of hopes and fears
Ended in peace; then let none weep for me
In mercy dost thou come, and I would be
Remembered happily, and not with tears.
