= Alfred M. Simpson =

Australian industrialist and politician

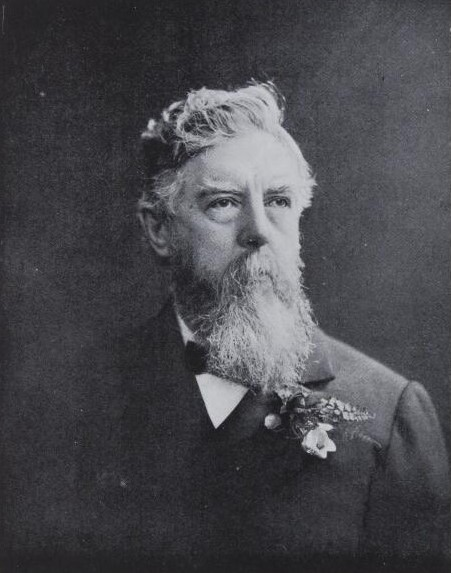

Alfred Muller Simpson (4 April 1843 – 28 September 1917), invariably known as Alfred M. Simpson or A. M. Simpson, was a South Australian industrialist, a principal of the manufacturing firm of A. Simpson & Son. He was a member of the South Australian Legislative Council from 1887 to 1894.

== History ==
Alfred M. Simpson was born in England, the son of silk hat manufacturer Alfred Simpson (1805 – 23 September 1891) and his wife Sarah Simpson, née Neighbour ( – 30 December 1874). The name "Muller" or "Müller" was bestowed on him in recognition of a business partner who proved unreliable, and thenceforth never mentioned by the family. After a series of financial setbacks the family emigrated, virtually penniless, to South Australia on the John Woodhall, arriving in January 1849, and in 1855 founded in Gawler Place the hardware firm that in April 1864 became A. Simpson & Son.

The young Alfred was educated at Mr. Martin's school in Pirie Street 1855–6 or 1856–7. He was from age 14 apprenticed as a tinsmith at his father's shop and worked for his father until his 21st birthday, when he was made a partner in the business. He gradually took greater control of the business, replacing simple hand tools with power machinery of all kinds — drills, grinders, guillotines, mills and presses, all belt-driven from overhead shafts driven by steam engines. The company's workforce grew from half-a-dozen to 500. He installed a foundry which became the largest consumer of pig iron in the colony. The range of products of the factory was ambitious. A notable product was a safe, whose fire-resisting properties were satisfactorily proved at a trial in the Adelaide Parklands in 1866, and exhibited the following year at the Adelaide Jubilee International Exhibition. A later model of the Simpson safe, following a rash of safe-blowing by "dynamitards", featured an explosion-proof lock. Simpson safes were to be found in banks and offices for much of the century. Bakers' ovens introduced around the same time and employing similar technology, were similarly successful and durable. The precision frames for the ovens were cast at Samuel Strapps' foundry in Currie Street. In 1868 a new factory was built at the corner of Grenfell Street and Gawler Place. In 1871 another factory was built further south on Gawler place, in the old (1841) Congregational chapel, once the home of J. L. Young's Adelaide Educational Institution. In 1876 they purchased a section on the corner of Pirie Street and Gawler Place. In 1894 vacant land in Wakefield Street was purchased from C. G. Everard for another factory, which later occupied 3 acres (1.2 ha).

A. M. Simpson was a director and major shareholder in the short-lived "SA Iron and Steel Company", formed in response to a Government incentive, to mine and smelt iron ore at Mount Jagged on Maslin's property near Victor Harbor. Some ore was smelted in 1874 and exhibited at the Show that year, but after a solid plug of smelted iron formed at the base of the furnace the project was abandoned. Other directors were J. Acraman, A. Sidney Clark and J. G. Ramsay.

For 49 years he held the reins as proprietor, and then passed most of the responsibilities onto his sons A. A. Simpson and F. N. Simpson, though retaining the role of managing director until his death. He continued to make visits to the company's head office in Gawler Place, and factories in Pirie street and Wakefield street.

== Politics ==
Simpson, first and foremost a business man, was reluctant to enter Parliament, but in 1887 (South Australia's jubilee year) he consented to contest a vacancy for the Central Division of the Legislative Council on behalf of the Protectionist Party. He signed the nomination paper on the Wednesday prior to the election, and did not address a single meeting, yet was returned at the head of the poll, as a colleague of J. H. Angas, also a Protectionist. He occupied the seat until 1894, then refused to nominate for the following election. He was a level-headed, straight politician of pronounced views. He not only opposed the introduction of payment of members, but, when that measure was carried, he gave the whole of his parliamentary allowance (£1,200) to be used as prize money for the encouragement of rifle shooting.

== Other interests ==
- He was a prominent Freemason, and served in various high offices. He contributed generously to the erection of the Adelaide Masonic Temple.
- He was interested in military matters: at 18 years of age he joined the first volunteer regiment raised in the Colony, and later transferred to the Adelaide Rifles.

In 1885 there was a fear that Great Britain and Russia would go to war, and when communication with Britain was interrupted due to a break in the submarine line, a scare arose that the Russians were about to invade. A. M. Simpson had his factory on a war footing, making electrically detonated submarine mines. He invented a trench periscope and mobile kitchens for use in the Great War. In March 1916 he made a gift of £2,250 to the defence authorities, which was used to purchase an F.E. 2B fighter plane.

- He played a prominent part in the 1887 Adelaide Jubilee International Exhibition.
- He was President of the Royal Agricultural and Horticultural Society for two years.
- He was a member of the first committee of the Australian National Union (the forerunner of the Australian Natives' Association).
- He was a trustee of the State Bank.
- He was a member of the Board of Conciliation for many years.
- He was in 1876, with W. C. Buik, David Murray and others, a founder of the Adelaide and Suburban Tramway Company. He succeeded Buik as chairman, which position he held until its dissolution, when its assets were taken over by the Municipal Tramways Trust.
- He was also for a long time on the boards of the Port Adelaide Dock Company and the South Australian Gas Company.
- He was a member of the Board of Governors of the Adelaide Botanic Gardens from 1899 and also contributed in concrete ways: he funded the brick kiosk in the grounds and, with R. Barr Smith the "boy and swan" fountain behind the palm house.
- He was Treasurer of the Adelaide Unitarian Christian Church, Wakefield Street, from 1884 to 1900.
- He was Treasurer of the South Australian Institute for the Blind and Deaf and Dumb, Brighton, from 1896.
- He was a relatively strong chess player, taking part in the first Adelaide tournament in 1864. He helped found the Adelaide Chess Club, and was its president from 1892. He underwrote the costs involved in bringing the English champion J. H. Blackburne to Adelaide, whose fees alone were £25 (perhaps $20,000 in today's money). In a simultaneous game Simpson was the last to succumb to the champion, though the star of the evening was Henry Charlick, who conducted two games, winning one and drawing the other; Blackburne's only reverses.
- He was a good friend of the St. John Ambulance Association
- and was for a long time Chairman of the Kalyra Sanatorium for Consumptives, and the associated Estcourt House.
- He was for many years, and up to the time of his death, a member of the council of the South Australian branch of the Royal Geographical Society of Australasia.
- He was, with Richard Smith and W. H. Holmes, a founder of the first Commercial Travellers and Warehousmen's Association, forerunner of the Commercial Travellers' Association, and its secretary until 1873, when it was wound up, and its cash assets passed to the Benevolent and Strangers' Friend Society.
- A. M. Simpson owned the land which later became Unley Shopping Centre.
- The Eastwood Institute was made possible by his significant donation to the Unley Council.

He suffered for a long time from defective eyesight, and died after some years suffering "a serious internal complaint", i.e. cancer.

== Legacy ==
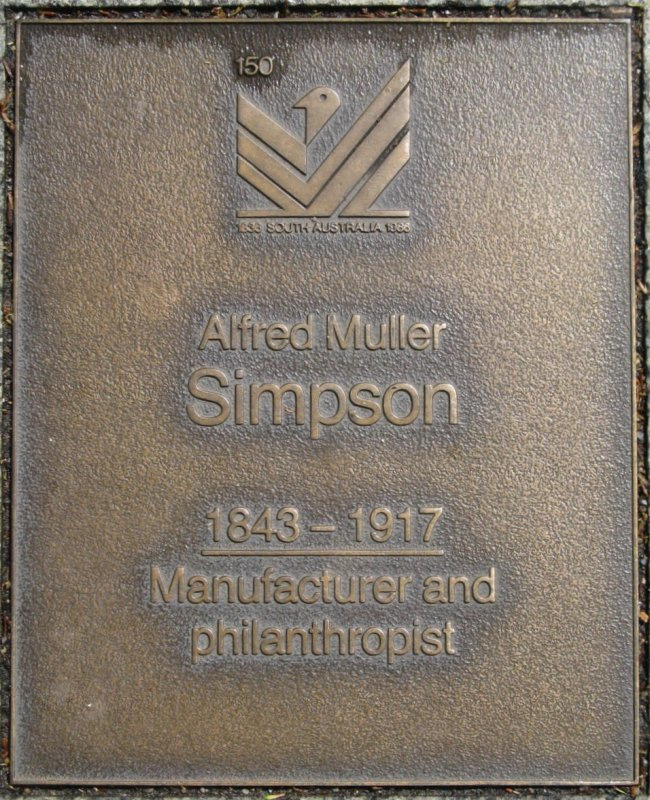

- The Simpson Rifle Trophy was established in 1893 with payments due to him as a member of Parliament, but would not personally accept.
- A plaque on the Jubilee 150 Walkway, North Terrace, was dedicated to him.

== Family ==
- Alfred M. Simpson (c. 1842 – 28 September 1917) married Catherine Allen ( – 16 October 1887) on 18 October 1871. She was a daughter of James Allen (c. 1815 – 11 August 1881) of Unley and Harriet Allen, née McKellar (c. 1814 – 12 July 1896), who arrived in South Australia with two sisters aboard the Lady Lilford in 1839, and married in 1844. Their children included:

- Alfred Allen Simpson (15 April 1875 – 27 November 1939) married Janet Doris Hübbe (1887 – 17 December 1950) on 6 January 1910. She was a daughter of educator Edith Agnes Hübbe
- Frederick Neighbour Simpson (21 May 1877 – 19 March 1954) married Myra Louise Wilcox ( –1966) on 5 April 1910
- Sarah Simpson (12 February 1882 – 1957) married Owen Crompton (1875–1923) on 27 September 1904. Owen was a son of industrialist Joseph Crompton
- Catherine Harriet Simpson (18 June 1884 – ) married Cyril Howard Welch RAMC on 31 May 1920
- Katie Allen Simpson (7 October 1887 – 1965) married Leonard Charles Simpson ( – 3 July 1953), a lieutenant of the Royal Artillery, in 1915. lived at 21 Rochester street, Leabrook. They were not cousins, but may have had the same great-grandfather.
He married again, to Violet Laura Sheridan (c. 1847 – 28 June 1921) on 23 August 1888. She was a daughter of Frances Keith Sheridan and Dr. John Sheridan, M.D. of Edinburgh and sister of Alice F. Keith Sheridan.

A sister, Catherine Simpson ( – 1 May 1917), married John Crawford Woods on 4 January 1882.
