= South Australian Chamber of Manufactures =

Lobbying Group

The South Australian Chamber of Manufactures (Note: Commonly, but erroneously, referred to as the South Australian Chamber of Manufacturers) was founded in 1868 to promote manufacturing industries in the Colony and State of South Australia. Strongly Protectionist, it lobbied on such subjects as unionized labour, Federation, rail standardization, penny postage, preference in Government contracts to locally manufactured goods, Government agencies competing with private industries, Government inspectors, industrial health and safety, cultivation of vines and olives, water conservation and irrigation, patent rights, workers' compensation, education, training and apprenticeships.

== History ==
The Chamber was the outcome of a meeting held on 26 March 1868 in Adelaide, convened by J. A. Holden and W. F. Gray, and came into being on 25 July 25 of the same year; it was the first such body founded in the Australian colonies.

One of its first successes was persuading the Government to offer a bonus of £2,000 for the first 10,000 yards of woollen cloth made in the colony, and resulted in the development of Onkaparinga Woollen Mills at Lobethal. (Note: Assertion of horse-driven loom operated by one Herr Kraum at Hahndorf has not been substantiated.)

Another success was the encouragement given to technical education. In 1876 the Chamber established night classes in mechanical drawing, at the Grote Street Public School, which led to the establishment of the South Australian School of Design.

The successes achieved as a result of these classes led to the establishment of other technical classes, which led to the formation in 1887 of a board which established the South Australian School of Mines and Industries.

=== Presidents ===
- Samuel Davenport (later Sir Samuel) 1868–88
- A. S. Clark, 1871–73
- A. Adamson, 1888–9
- J. J. Green, 1889–91
- James Duncan, 1891–3
- L. Grayson, 1893–5
- T. Hardy, 1835–7
- W. W. Forwood, 1897–9
- W. Burford, 1899–1901
- L. P. Lawrence, 1801–3
- J. M. Reid, 1903–6
- R. Burns Cuming, 1906–7
- G. F. Cleland, 1907–10
- E. C. Vardon, 1910–11
- A. Hill, 1912–13
- W. W. Forwood, 1913–15
- H. B. Thompson, 1915–17
- J. A. Harper 191–20
- J. W. McGregor, 1920–22
- S. Perry, 1822–25
- Robert Duncan, 1925–27
- F. N. Simpson, 1927–28
- Edward Holden, 1936–39
- W. G. Gerard, 1953–54

=== Secretaries ===
- F. V. Pizey 1868–74
- J. F. Conigrave, 1874–88
- E. H. Derrington, 1888–89
- W. Clark, 1889–90
- F. H. Evans, 1890–1907
- H. E. Winterbottom, 1907–

=== Homes of the Chamber ===
The original office was located in Register Chambers, Grenfell Street. In 1877 a lease was obtained of the Santo Buildings, Waymouth Street, under financial arrangements criticised by Rowland Rees as over-generous. A museum of early manufacturing efforts was established there, but it was dispersed in 1927 with the move to the new building, as there was no space available. In 1889 the Government provided offices in the Eastern annexe of the Jubilee Exhibition Building. Subsequently it removed to a large room in front of the Exhibition Building. The Chamber erected its own building in 1927 at s cost of £45,000.

== Merger ==
In 1972 the South Australian Chamber of Manufactures merged with the Adelaide Chamber of Commerce (founded 1839) to form the Chamber of Commerce and Industry SA Inc, which in 1993 merged with the South Australian Employers' Federation (founded 1889) to form the South Australian Employers' Chamber of Commerce and Industry, "Business SA".
