= St Peter's Girls' School =

Location
- Stonyfell Road, Stonyfell, Adelaide, South Australia; Australia; 34°55′47″S 138°40′09″E

Information
- Type: Independent early learning, primary and secondary day school
- Motto: Pro Ecclesia Dei, Beati Mundo Corde (For the Church of God, Blessed are the Pure in Heart)
- Denomination: Anglican
- Established: 1894; 132 years ago
- Chair of the Board of Governors: James Lawes
- Principal: Cherylyn Skewes
- Years: Early learning–12
- Gender: Girls
- Enrolment: 730
- Area: 4 hectares (9 acres)
- Campus type: Suburban
- Colours: Royal blue and white
- Affiliations: Independent Girls Schools Sports Association
- Website: www.stpetersgirls.sa.edu.au

St Peter's Girls' School (commonly known as Saints Girls) is an independent Anglican early learning, primary and secondary day school for girls located in the Adelaide suburb of Stonyfell, in South Australia, Australia.

Founded in 1894 and originally located in Kermode Street, North Adelaide (at the current site of the Women's and Children's Hospital), the School is currently located in Stonyfell, 5 kilometres (3.1 mi) east of the Adelaide central business district. The school is located on one campus with students from Early learning to Year 12.

St Peter's Girls' is a day school which offers the South Australian Certificate of Education (SACE) and is an authorised International Baccalaureate (IB) World School teaching both the Primary Years Program in the Junior School and the Diploma Program in Years 11 and 12. There is no boarding available.

== History ==
Opened in 1894 by the Community of Sisters of the Church, the School was originally established in North Adelaide (Kermode St). The Sisters who opened the School were English women who had joined the Anglican Sisterhood founded in 1870 by Emily Ayckbowm, with its headquarters in the London suburb of Kilburn. The members of the community were active in educational and social work in England and because the then Bishop of Adelaide, Bishop Kennion, knew of this he asked them to come and serve. His request was answered by the arrival in Adelaide of the first sisters in 1892, and the school opened in 1894 with four pupils. St. Peter's was not the only school founded by the Sisters of the Church, with many other schools in Australasia also being established. The School's motto. Pro Ecclesia Dei; Beati Mundo Corde was taken from the motto of the CSC, and can be found on other logos of the CSC schools. The motto means For the Church of God: Blessed are the Pure in Heart, with the second part of the motto being the School's Hymn.

The School remained at Kermode Street (on the present sites of The Memorial Hospital and the Western Side of the Women's and Children's Hospital) until May 1957, where the move was made to Stonyfell, 6 kilometres (3.7 mi) east of the City of Adelaide. The move was made so the Women's and Children's Hospital could undertake necessary expansions. The School purchased in 1949 at auction, the Chiverton House owned by the Ferguson family, as well as 3.6 hectares (9 acres) of land surrounding the property on the corner on Hallett Road. The remainder of the land was given to the Government for Environmental Heritage. Chiverton at auction was a 14-room residence, with an external two room cottage with attached horse stables. The move was orchestrated during the leadership of Sister Scholastica - a previous student of the school, who became a CSC Sister. During this era, the Main Building was constructed, comprising an assembly hall, tuck shop and 24 classrooms. The Main Building has allowed for the foundation of many subsequent buildings over the decades. In the late 1960s, science laboratories were built, and an extension the eastern side of the Main Building were completed for a Library.

In 1969, the first lay Head, Elizabeth Pike, was appointed. During her era, further building works occurred. Improvements to the oval, as well as the construction of a swimming pool and sports pavilion with Gymnasium were additions to the sport areas. Additionally, a Junior School Library and Visual Arts Centre were also built, with the introduction of Home Economics as a subject.

Douglas Stott was the second Head and it was during his tenure, in 1985 that the Sisters had decided that it was time to establish an incorporated Board of Governors with the School and subsequent assets to the Board. It was in 1994 that the School celebrated its Centenary, with the construction of the Centenary Wing on the eastern side of the Main Building. The wing contained the Humzy Theatre, as well as new Information Technology Centres.

Diane Nicholls became Headmistress in 1996, and began an era of growth and development within the school. During her time in the role, a new uniform was introduced, and extensions for Administration offices were made to Chiverton House as well as an extension of the carpark. Year 7 was moved into a new Middle Sub-School, including Years 8 and 9 in 2000. In 2004, the School celebrated its 110th year of operation. A play, featuring all students was shown at the Festival Theatre. An extension to the Preschool was made, as well as a rebranding to the Early Learning Centre in 2005. In 2007, the School celebrated 50 years at the Stonyfell Campus.

Fiona Godfrey became Principal in 2008 and continued growth in enrolments and building works. The most significant was the 700 seat, Performing Arts Centre completed in 2010. Several technological initiatives were also introduced, such as a Personal Device program as well as the installation of Smart Boards in classrooms.

Julia Shea became the current Principal in the 120th year of operation in 2014. During her first year, the School played host to a 100 students from other CSC schools in Oceania for a week-long music festival.

== Campus and facilities ==
Situated on 4 hectares (9 acres) of land, the Stonyfell Campus lies on the corners of Stonyfell and Hallett Roads, with the main entrance on Stonyfell Road.

The School has an oval on the campus (and is one of the only all-girls' schools in Adelaide to do so), as well as a 25 metres (82 ft) swimming pool, a gymnasium, six tennis/netball courts (with two also being able to be used for hockey), a chapel, seven science laboratories, senior and junior libraries, a 700-seat performing arts centre, and an early learning centre. The School also has access to Bellyett Reserve (opposite the School on Stonyfell Road) for various sporting events as well as sports practices.

The School has been moving forwards on a master plan to "modernise" the school facilities. Currently, they are building a new and improved Science and Technology building for middle and senior students.

== House system ==
The School's House system was introduced in 1927 to foster a sense of belonging and encourage friendly rivalry and competition.

Upon enrolling at the School, students are allocated into one of the four School Houses, each named after a prominent figure in the School's history: Kennion (pale blue), Kilburn (yellow), Patteson (red), or Selwyn (green). The four houses engage in numerous inter-house competitions every year, including: Sports Day, Swimming Carnival, House Music Eisteddford, Summer and Winter inter-house sports, inter-house debating, as well as the hotly contested Choral Night, widely regarded as the community highlight on the School's calendar.

== Sport ==
St Peter's Girls' School is a member of the Independent Girls Schools Sports Association (IGSSA).

=== IGSSA premierships ===
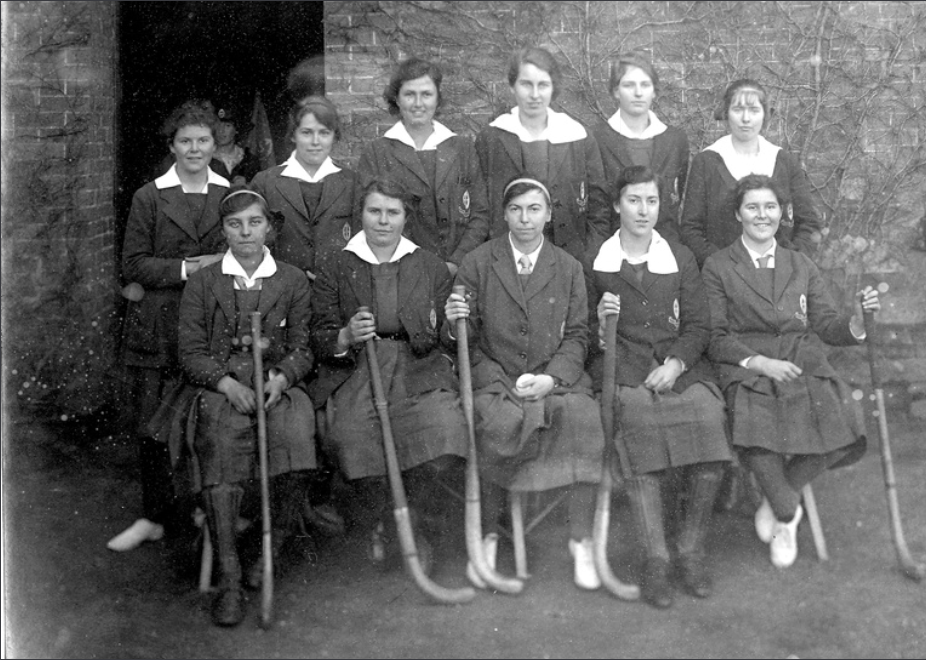
St Peter's Collegiate Girls' School hockey team (Elizabeth Auld in centre of front row), 1920

St Peter's Girls' School has won the following IGSSA premierships.

- Athletics (5) – 2016, 2017, 2018, 2019, 2020
- Badminton (7) – 1997, 2010, 2011, 2012, 2013, 2019, 2020
- Hockey (2) – 1983, 1996
- Swimming (5) – 2016, 2017, 2019, 2020, 2021
- Tennis (4) – 2001, 2016, 2017, 2018
- Volleyball (2) – 2015, 2021

== Alumnae ==
Some of the School's notable alumnae include:

- Elizabeth Auld, (1901–1998) leading journalist
- Julie Bishop, Australia's first female Minister for Foreign Affairs
- Mary (Angel) Burnell, anaesthetist
- Mavournee Hazel, actress
- Sarah McLeod, frontwoman of Australian rock band The Superjesus
- Thérèse Rein, prominent businesswoman and wife of Kevin Rudd (Rein also attended Firbank Grammar School)
- Rachel Sanderson, member of the South Australian Parliament for the seat of Adelaide
- Kathleen Sauerbier, modernist artist
- Gwendolyne Daphne Stevens, entrepreneur and uranium mine discoverer
- Amanda Vanstone, former Minister for Immigration and Australian Ambassador to Italy
- Jean Whyte (1923–2003), foundation professor of the Graduate School of Librarianship at Monash University
