= John Crawford Woods =

Church minister (1824–1906)

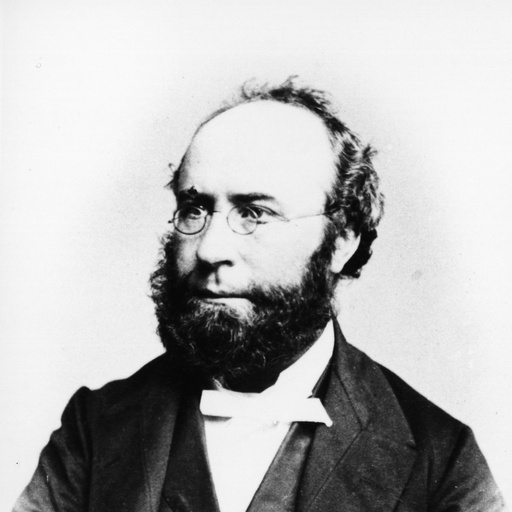

John Crawford Woods (8 April 1824 – 10 May 1906), generally referred to as J. Crawford Woods, was the first minister of the Adelaide Unitarian Christian Church, South Australia, serving from 1855 to 1889.

== History ==
Woods was born in Woodville, a mile from Bangor, County Down, Ireland, the fourth child and second son of (Presbyterian) Rev. Hugh Thean Woods and his wife Magdelene Campbell Woods, née McClure. They had a small farm of 40 acres (16 ha) and lived comfortably if frugally with a manservant, thanks to the income from the farm and a succession of boarders which supplemented his stipend of around £167 p.a.. He was educated at a school in Bangor run by Mrs Blain, wife of Dr. Thomas Blain of the Royal Academic Institute, Belfast, followed by a school for girls run by the sisters Mecredy (accompanying his sister Maria), then another run by James MacMaster. His father next engaged as tutors for his family a young theology student named Robert Campbell, followed by a nephew William Woods, then Robert Montgomery, another theology student. In 1839 he enrolled at the University of Edinburgh, where he graduated BA in 1845, winning prizes in Greek and Modern Philosophy. He took a position in Downham Market, near Sandringham House, as assistant and tutor to the children of Dr. James Patterson, originally of "Ballymore, County Antrim" [sic, most likely Ballymoney].

Presbyterians in Ireland were much freer in their religious beliefs than those of England, and having read Dr. Channing and attended lectures by the Rev. John Scott Porter, Woods decided to become a Unitarian. His father was unconcerned, but mother was not sympathetic, with the result that he went as a Non-subscribing Presbyterian ministry student to the newly founded Queen's University Belfast, where he read Theology under Dr. Henry Montgomery and the Rev. John Scott Porter and studied Hebrew. He may have also studied medicine. He tutored the children of cotton baron John Leech of Gorse Hall in Cheshire for nearly four years, then briefly served as minister of a Presbyterian Church at Newtownards.

He served as minister to the Unitarian church in Devonport, where he fell in love with Susan Perriman Harris, who he would later marry, then Northampton, St. Mark's Chapel, Edinburgh for nearly four years, and the Isle of Wight before answering a call to Adelaide, South Australia, where a small but influential group was building a church of their own.

On 1 July 1854 William Blyth, A. Sidney Clark, William Kay and five others advertised for people interested in forming a Unitarian congregation to meet at the Freemasons' Tavern on 11 July. Despite public notices in various newspapers every day in the preceding week, only twelve attended, but they resolved to appoint a minister as soon as one year's salary (£400) had been collected. This achieved, in October that year the committee authorised the British and Foreign Unitarian Association to select a suitable candidate, offering an additional £200 for travelling and relocation expenses. Their choice was Rev. John Crawford Woods, of Newport, Isle of Wight.

Woods and his wife arrived in South Australia aboard Quito on 19 September 1855 after a long (123 days), stormy, and eventful (Note: During the 1855–56 voyage of Quito, the captain got so drunk in Bahia that he sailed out of the harbor into the teeth of a gale and tore the sails; the mate took over and the crew mutinied.) voyage, and stayed for a time at "Hazelwood", the home of Francis and Caroline Clark and family. His first service was held at "Hazelwood", the second at the home of Edward Martin on Osmond Terrace, Norwood. From 14 October 1855 services were held in a room attached to Green's Exchange, and were well attended. The church was a success from the start, attracting many prominent figures, including Catherine Helen Spence, and the decision to erect a church building was made. A portion of city Section 302 on Wakefield Street was made over to the church by Dr. William Everard for a very modest sum, (Note: Many references have the land transaction as a gift.) and the corner stone was laid on 23 December 1856. Woods took the first services on the morning and evening of Sunday 5 July 1857 to a large assembly. Prominent early supporters of the church were Dr. Charles Davies of North Adelaide, Henry Higginson of North Adelaide, John Howard Clark and Mrs Clark of Hazelwood, William Kay of Norwood, Dr. and William Everard, William Sanderson, Vernon Herford and James Allen.

The church prospered from the start, largely due to Woods' oratory and thoughtful sermons. He officiated at many weddings in Wakefield Street, not all participants being Unitarians; secular Jews and most likely marriages between Catholics and Protestants, which in those days would not be countenanced by either. He also officiated at many weddings in secular spaces, J. M. Wendt being a well-known example.

In March 1874 Woods returned to England aboard Collingrove for an extended holiday, visiting his brothers and renewing old acquaintances. Charles Lawrence Whitham, who arrived aboard Cyphrenea earlier that month, acted as locum tenens. Whitham and Rev. Martha Turner from Melbourne engaged in a three-week pulpit exchange during September–October 1875, an eye-opening experience for C. H. Spence.

The Woods spent a year in Newport, Isle of Wight, where Woods officiated at the church. They returned to Adelaide aboard the clipper Torrens on her maiden voyage, arriving in March 1876 and resumed serving the Adelaide congregation. In June 1877 Turner engaged in another pulpit exchange, this time with Woods.

Catherine Helen Spence, who had been a regular member of the congregation from its inception, preached her first sermons at Wakefield Street in 1878 and filled the pulpit during Woods' occasional absences between 1884 and 1889. It was during this period, in 1881, that the congregation peaked at 747 members. He resigned in 1887 after attendance at the evening service had dropped away to a considerable extent and a dispute arose as to the cause, (an alternative explanation was that it was on account of his declining health) but it was two years before a suitable replacement was found in the Rev. Robert Cooper Dendy of Tenterden, Kent, and Woods continued as pastor. He gave his last sermon on 18 May 1889, and on 20 May 1889 Woods and his wife left for England by the P.& O. steamer Parramatta. Again Woods revisited familiar places and old friends, and spent some time seeing the sights of Europe. They returned to Adelaide by the P.& O. steamer Victoria in 1892.

Woods died 10 March 1906 at his home in Rochester Street, Knightsbridge.

== Other activities ==
- Woods gave a great many lectures at Institutes in the countryside, for which he was paid £2 plus travelling expenses by the Government. The subjects were usually of an enlightening or instructional non-sectarian nature, enhanced by Woods' sense of humour, and were well attended. In this way Woods was able to see a great deal of the Colony.
- When the University of Adelaide was founded he was admitted BA ad eundem, and was one of two University-appointed Governors of the South Australian Institute, along with Sir Samuel Way.

== Publications ==
- Bishop Colenso, the Friend of Free Enquiry, Rational Piety and Human Progress, a Lecture by the Rev. J. Crawford Woods, B.A. 1864.

== Family ==
Woods married three times:

- Susan Perriman Harris ( – 24 February 1851) sometime around 1850; she died of puerperal fever after the birth of his only child,

- Arthur McClure Woods (Note: His middle name has been ambiguously spelled McClure and Maclure in roughly equal proportions, even by his father and the Registrar of Births, Deaths and Marriages.) (24 February 1851 – 14 October 1894) was brought up by his grandparents at the Woodville (Ireland) farm and sent for by his father at age nine years. He was educated at J. L. Young's Adelaide Educational Institution, found employment with the E S & A bank, and married Kate Hawkins on 24 July 1876.

- He married the widow Sarah Thompson Cooper ( – 1880) at Newport, Isle of Wight, in May 1855. Sarah accompanied Annie Montgomerie Martin on her visit to "the old country" from 1859 to 1861.
- Catherine Simpson (died 1 May 1917) on 4 January 1882. Catherine was a sister of A. M. Simpson.
