= Arthur Noyes (organist) =

Arthur Noyes (2 Jan 1863 – 9 January 1929) was the organist at St. Ignatius' Catholic Church, Norwood, South Australia from 1902 to 1929. His long service was singularly if not uniquely recognised by a commemorative window in the church.

== History ==
Noyes was born in England the second son of the Rev. J. H. Noyes, M.A., vicar of Ketton, England. He studied organ under Dr. Haydn Keeton, followed by Mamby Seargeson of St Peter's Church, Eaton Square, London.

Around late 1889 he and his small family left England for South Australia, and must have joined the Education Department, as in April 1890 he was assigned to the school at World's End Creek, living at Kooringa, Burra, where he gave private music lessons.

His first appointment as a church organist in South Australia appears to be in 1898 at the Redruth Wesleyan Church, Burra.

He began as organist and choirmaster of St. Ignatius' Catholic Church early in 1902. He never missed a Christmas or Easter Mass, until the Christmas of 1928 when he was prevented by his final illness.

Noyes also served as an orchestra leader and a teacher of music, and is reported as having composed music for the organ, but appears not to have been published. He was an ardent worker for charitable affairs and during the war was involved in many soldiers' benefit organizations.

He died at the Sisters' Nursing Hospital, North Adelaide, and was buried in the Catholic section of West Terrace Cemetery (he was a convert to Catholicism).

== Recognition ==
His service to St. Ignatius' Church was commemorated in a stained-glass window by local artist Nora Burden, installed in the church porch.

== Family ==
Arthur Charles Noyes (c. 1862 – 1929) married Eliza "Lizzie" Hill (c. 1868 – 27 December 1946) in England. Their children included:

- (Mary) Blanche Noyes ( – 1968) married Harry Duke ( – ) of Victoria

- Hamilton "Ross" Duke ( – ) married Gwen Burman ( – ) on 16 January 1943, had son 22 February 1945
She married again, to Arthur Edward Cuthbertson ( – 1990) in 1927; lived in Ford Street, Maylands

- Cyril Henry Noyes (14 May 1889 – 1963) married Gertrude Tryphena Plenty (1889 – 1970) on 17 April 1919, born in Lincolnshire, lived in Kensington. Enlisted with AIF November 1914, was an unsuccessful Labor candidate for Kensington and Norwood councillor in 1937.
- Keith Hayden Noyes (c. June 1891 – 8 November 1916) enlisted with AIF January 1916, died of wounds in France
- Beryl Wayte Noyes (1894–) married Werner Walter (Walter Werner?) Weidenbach (1884 – 1933) on 3 November 1923, lived in Kensington Gardens

- Richard Edwin Weidenbach (1925–)

- Olive Nell "Nellie" Noyes (1896 – 1952) married Herbert Basedow (1881 – 1933) on 4 June 1919, lived in Kent Town. They had no children.
- (Arthur) Ivo Noyes (1902 – 1972) married Eenith Johnson Ridley on 14 September 1929, lived in Norwood
