= Adolphe Emile Marval =

French-born educator and art dealer

Adolphe Emile Marval (c. 1845 – 11 July 1935) was a French-born educator and art dealer in Adelaide, South Australia. His first wife Anna ( – 25 February 1905) was a German-born educator; his second wife Caroline (c. 1861 – 7 January 1941) was a philanthropist and abortion care provider.

== History ==
Adolphe Marval was born in France and may have taught at Ecclesall College, Sheffield before he came to South Australia in 1864 to teach at St. Peter's College. He also conducted private classes and taught at other private schools, notably J. L. Young's Adelaide Educational Institution. He was hon. secretary of the French Relief Fund committee in 1871. In May 1884 he signed the Oath of Allegiance to become a naturalised British subject. He was appointed Justice of the Peace, resigned 1887.

He married Anna Thilo, daughter of Professor Wilhelm Thilo of Berlin, on 25 June 1872. She had been awarded a diploma (Geprũfte Lehrerin fũr Preußen) from the Ladies' University of Berlin, and came to South Australia as a governess for the children of Sir James Fergusson. Following a return to Europe in 1873, the Marvals returned to Adelaide, where he worked as tutor and she as head of a school for young ladies, operating from Ramsay House, once the home of Dr. Gosse on the Rundle Place (now Gawler Place) corner of North Terrace. She took boarders and day pupils, and taught singing, dancing and deportment, as well as French. Anna Montgomerie Martin was one of her teachers. In December 1874 they took over the staff and students of Miss Senner's school, Palm House, Hackney.

By 1878 he was a ratepayer of Brighton and in 1882 Mme. Marval's academy was operating at their home "De la Haye" on Brighton Road. In that year he became a member of Brighton Council. He was appointed chairman of the Brighton Board of Health and elected mayor of Brighton in 1884. He was a director of the Brighton Tramway Company (or Glenelg, Brighton and Marino Tramway Company). In 1880 Mme. Marval began teaching music, gratis, to blind students.

By 1887 her school had moved to her home "De la Haye", 65 The Parade, Norwood. Mme. Marval later taught at the Deaf Dumb and Blind Institution. She died of diabetes at home on 25 February 1905.

He was an art connoisseur and turned commission agent and fine art dealer with a private gallery at 121 Pirie Street, and owned a valuable collection of engravings by Pietro Tosto, paintings by Murillo and Vandyke, and an etching by Hogarth. He was deputised by the Art Gallery of South Australia to purchase works from the estate of Melbourne collector Mme. De Hazard in 1887. He returned to Paris for the Exhibition of 1889 to procure works for his gallery, and again in 1900.

A. E. Marval married again. His second wife, Caroline Emma Mutton Marval, née McPhillamy (c. 1861 – 7 January 1941), a palmist, was a generous contributor to the Belgian Relief Fund, and manufactured confectionery for Australian soldiers during World War I, a work which was initially deprecated by many, and which she continued to make after the war in aid of various charities.

Mme. Marval was a nurse, often treating patients at her home, "Cumberland House", 4 George Street, Norwood. She had been involved in the 1914 death from septicaemia of Ellen Phyland, but no charges were laid due to lack of evidence. Mme. Marval was convicted of manslaughter by Mr. Justice Cleland following the 1941 death of Edith Millburn, aged 20, from blood loss following "an illegal operation". At sentencing Mr Justice Cleland stated that he did not believe Mme Marval was guilty, that she had in fact tried to save Edith Milburn after she had been operated on by another person, however Mme Marval refused to name the other person and Mr Justice Cleland was therefore left with no choice but to find her guilty. Mme Marval refused food and drink and died at the Royal Adelaide Hospital.

== Family ==
Their daughter Adele Thilo Marval (3 October 1874 – ) was a talented violinist. Their second son Sydney Waldegrave Carver Marval (born c. 1889) was killed in action 1919.
