= Dynamitard =

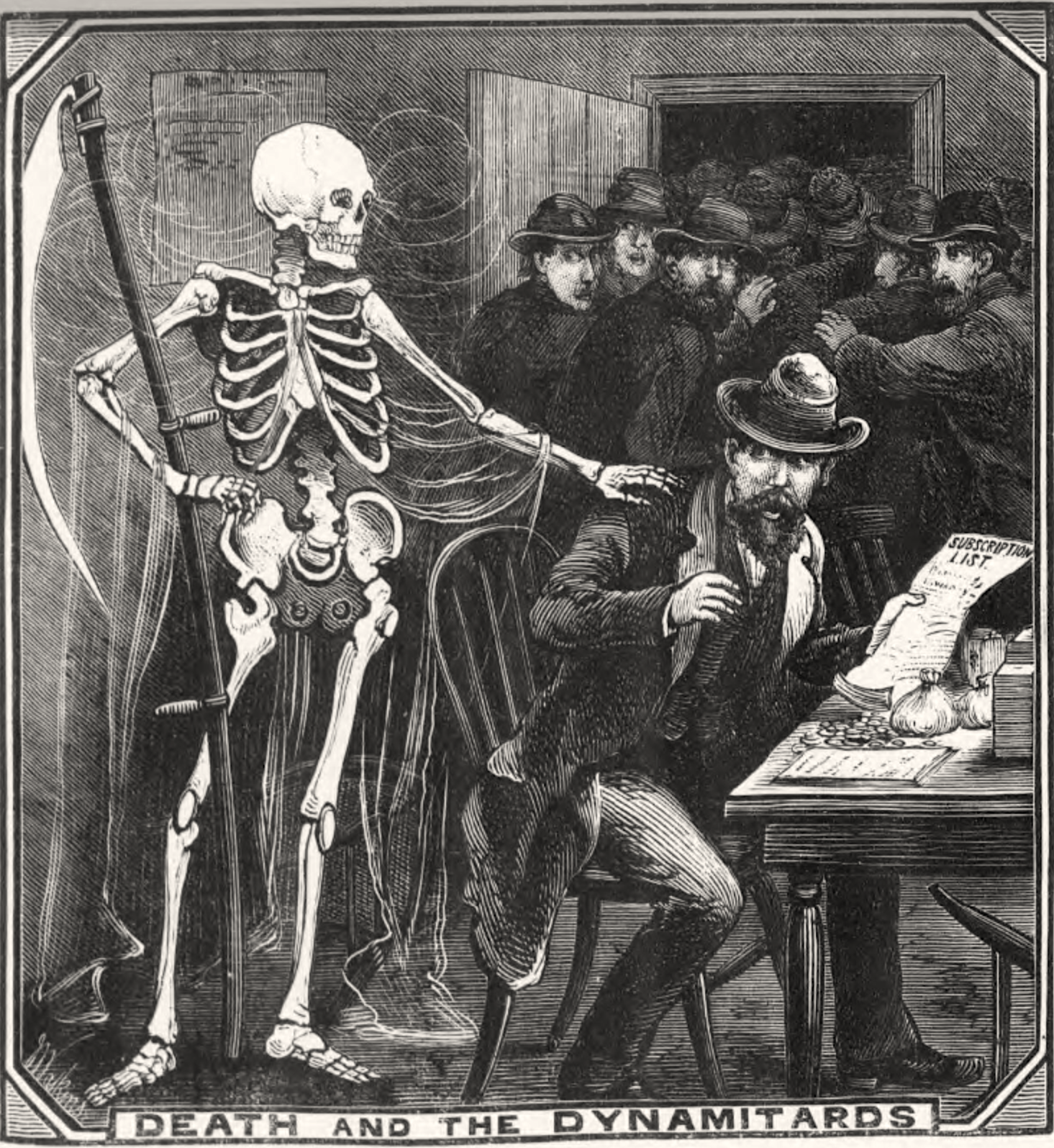
Illustrated Police News, London, 21 February 1885

A dynamitard was a person who used explosives for violence against the state, and is a niche metaphor for a revolutionary in politics, culture or social affairs.

== Bombers ==
First appearing in English language newspapers in 1882, the word was understood to be a French expression applied to political terrorists in France. In reality, dynamitard is not a formal French word; French newspapers had conjured it up as a disdainful variant of dynamiteur. It was soon applied to Harry or Henry Burton and James Gilbert Cunningham, Irish-Americans who were charged with high treason and felony at Bow Street Police Court in 1885 for planting explosives in London and elsewhere. "A term of opprobrium for some and endearment for others, the dynamitard was technically a political dynamiter, of the kind that bombed railway carriages and exploded devices in the House of Commons in the name of Irish freedom, chiefly in the early 1880s."

== Metaphorical sense ==
In nineteenth century politics the term came to be used, particularly by George Bernard Shaw, as metonymy for those who chose violent struggle — as opposed to gradual means — for achieving social revolution: a dynamitard was contrasted with a Fabian. Shaw himself, though a Fabian in politics, was described metaphorically as "a dynamitard among music and drama critics".

== In popular culture ==
Between 1889 and 1903 Stevenston Thistle, who played in the Ayrshire Football League and elsewhere, were known as The Dynamitards. They did not live up to their name, however, losing 7-2 to Clyde F.C. in the first round of the 1894–95 Scottish Cup.

== In high culture ==
Mocked as a neologism by Robert Louis and Fanny van de Grift Stevenson ("Any writard who writes dynamitard shall find in me a never-resting fightard"), its presence in dictionaries regretted by purists, there it has remained.

== Sources ==
=== Books, journals and theses ===
- Burton, Antoinette (2015). "Review: The Dynamiters: Irish Nationalism and Political Violence in the Wider World, 1867– 1900 by Niall Whelehan: Alter-Nations: Nationalisms, Terror and the State in Nineteenth-Century Britain and Ireland by Amy E. Martin". Victorian Studies. 57 (2). Indiana University Press: 348–50. doi:10.2979/victorianstudies.57.2.348. JSTOR 10.2979/victorianstudies.57.2.348.
- Gassner, John (1962). "Bernard Shaw and the Making of the Modern Mind". College English. 23 (7). National Council of Teachers of English: 517–525. doi:10.2307/373086. JSTOR 373086.
- Glaser, Kurt (1910). "Le sens péjoratif du suffixe-ard en français". Romanische Forschung (in French). 27 (3). Vittorio Klostermann GmbH: 932–982. JSTOR 27935761.
- Laurence, Dan H. (1954). "Bernard Shaw and the Pall Mall Gazette: An Identification of His Unsigned Contributions". Bulletin (Shaw Society of America) (6). Penn State University Press: 1–7. JSTOR 40681278.
- McDowell, Matthew Lynn (2010). "The origins, patronage and culture of association football in the west of Scotland, c. 1865-1902. PhD thesis" (PDF). University of Glasgow theses.
- Stevenson, Robert Louis; van de Grift Stevenson, Fanny (1885). More New Arabian Nights: the Dynamiter. Leisure hour series, no. 162. New York: Henry Holt.
- Wallmann, Jeffrey M. (1997). "Evolutionary Machinery: Foreshadowings of Science Fiction in Bernard Shaw's Dramas". Shaw. 17, SHAW AND SCIENCE FICTION. Penn State University Press: 91–95. JSTOR 40681465.

=== Newspaper reports and websites ===
- "The Red Spectre in France". Pall Mall Gazette. London. 28 October 1882.
- "Monday morning, October 30". Glasgow Herald. 30 October 1882.
- "Evening News". Manchester Evening News. 31 October 1882.
- "From our London Correspondent". Manchester Evening News. 7 April 1883.
- "The Dynamite Outrages". The Times. 10 February 1885.
- "Miscellaneous". Luton Times and Advertiser. 13 March 1885.
- "Sports". Ardrossan and Saltcoats Herald. 4 October 1889.
- "Ayrshire Notes". Scottish Referee. 21 November 1902.
- "Derivations". The Times. 17 March 1950.
- Historical Football Kit. "Eminent Victorians". Archived from the original on 12 September 2011.
