= Stonyfell, South Australia =

Eastern suburb of Adelaide, in the City of Burnside council area, South Australia

Stonyfell
- Suburb
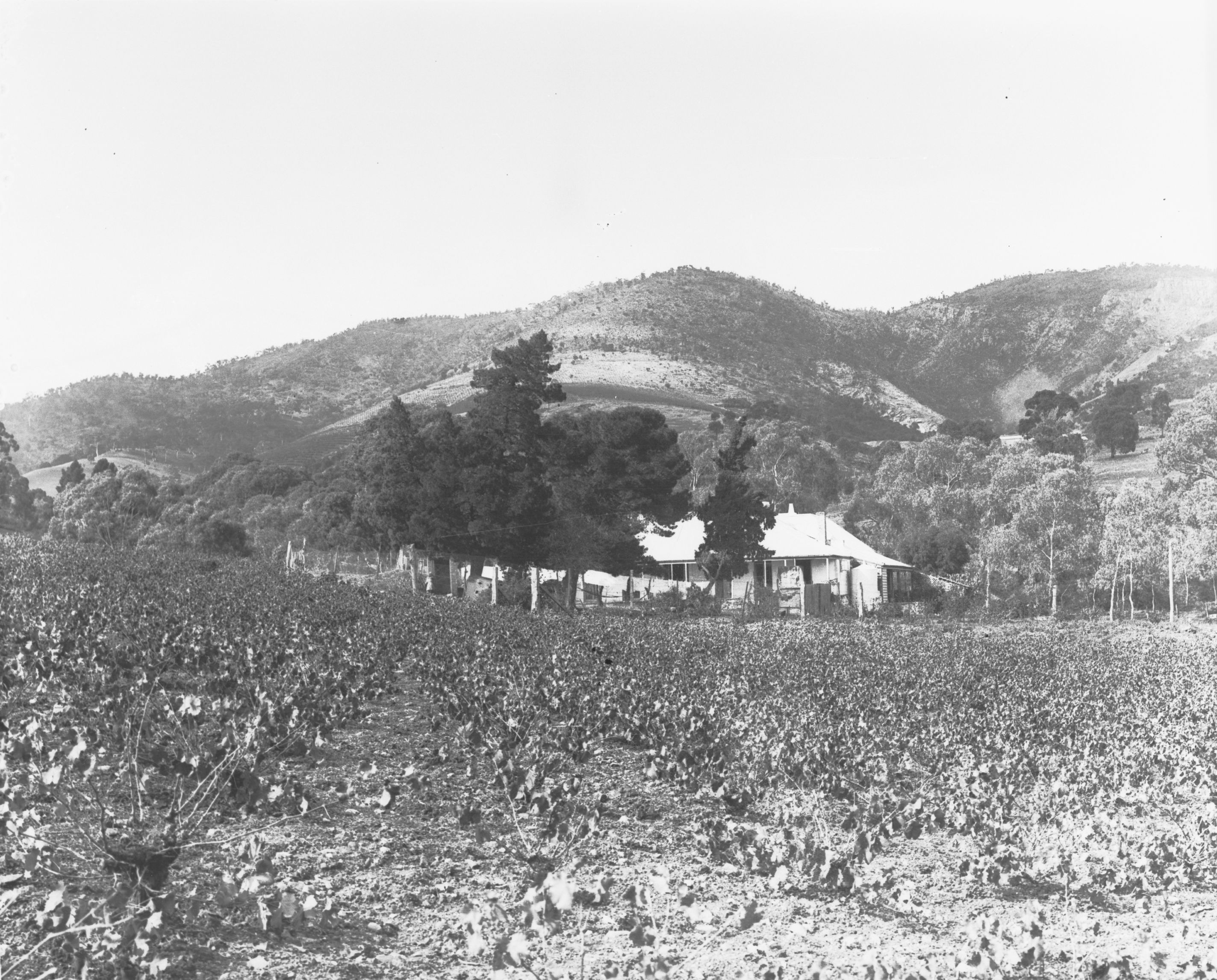
- Stonyfell, ca. 1915

- Country: Australia
- State: South Australia
- LGA: City of Burnside

Government
  - State electorate: Bragg
  - Federal division: Sturt

Population
  - Total: 1,266 (SAL 2021)
- Postcode: 5066
Suburbs around Stonyfell
Erindale	Wattle Park
	Stonyfell	Greenhill
Burnside	Hazelwood Park

Stonyfell is an eastern suburb in the foothills of Adelaide, Australia, within the council area of the City of Burnside. It has parks with walking tracks, and two creeks running through it. St Peter's Collegiate Girls' School is the only school in Stonyfell. There is a quarry and a winery, the present-day remnants of industries dating back to the early days of the colonisation of South Australia.

== History ==
The area was inhabited by the Kaurna people before settlement by Europeans.

=== Quarry and winery ===
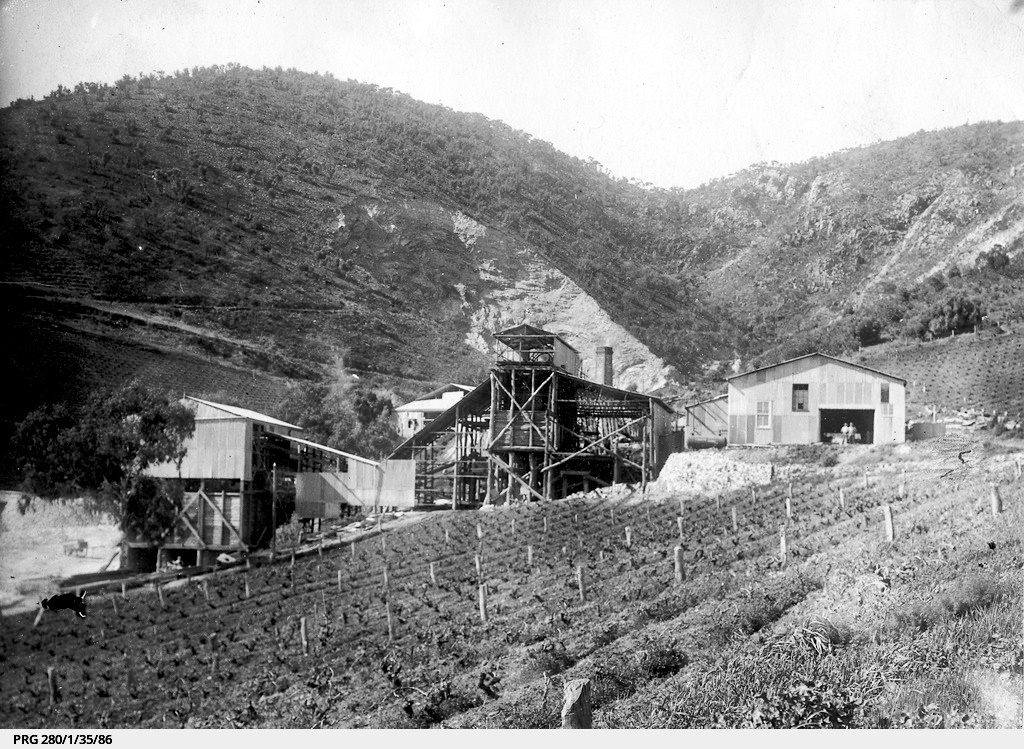
Stonyfell quarry, c.1923

James Edlin opened the first quarry in the hundred of Adelaide on Section 1050 in 1837, to supply building stone and slate to local builders. G. Walker Johnson and Arthur Hardy took over the quarry by 1850 and it became known as Beacon Hill Quarry.

In 1858, Henry Septimus Clark purchased land near the quarry from Edlin in order to establish a vineyard. His fiancée, Annie Montgomery Martin, dubbed the land "Stonyfell" (a "fell" being a term used for barren or uncultivated high ground in Northern England). Clark started planting the original vineyard with assistance from Robert Slape. He built the two-storey wine cellars in the side of the hill, from locally quarried stone. By 1862, 25 acres (10 ha) had been planted with vines, mostly of the Black Portugal variety. Joseph Crompton assisted in the vineyard, and in 1862 established a partnership with Clark and his brother A. Sidney Clark to conduct the business of winemakers, trading as Clark and Crompton. The company offices were in the same building as Francis Clark and Sons, with a warehouse in Blyth Street, Adelaide. On Henry's death, Sidney inherited his share of the business, which he sold to Crompton in 1873, though the business name remained "Clark and Crompton" until 1880. Crompton took over the Home Park Winery at Magill, at which time Henry Tyler was the winemaker.

Crompton married Susan Mary, sister of Clark, in 1866.

The house and property, including the vineyards and winery, was taken over by quarry operator Henry Dunstan in 1886 or 1888, after he had acquired nearby properties for quarrying in 1877. In 1892 he separated the quarry and wine business, forming two companies. He employed Henry Martin as his secretary and accountant, with the company first called "H.Dunstan & Co. Winegrowers". Martin's son Ronald joined his father in 1902, trading as H.M. & R.H. Martin.

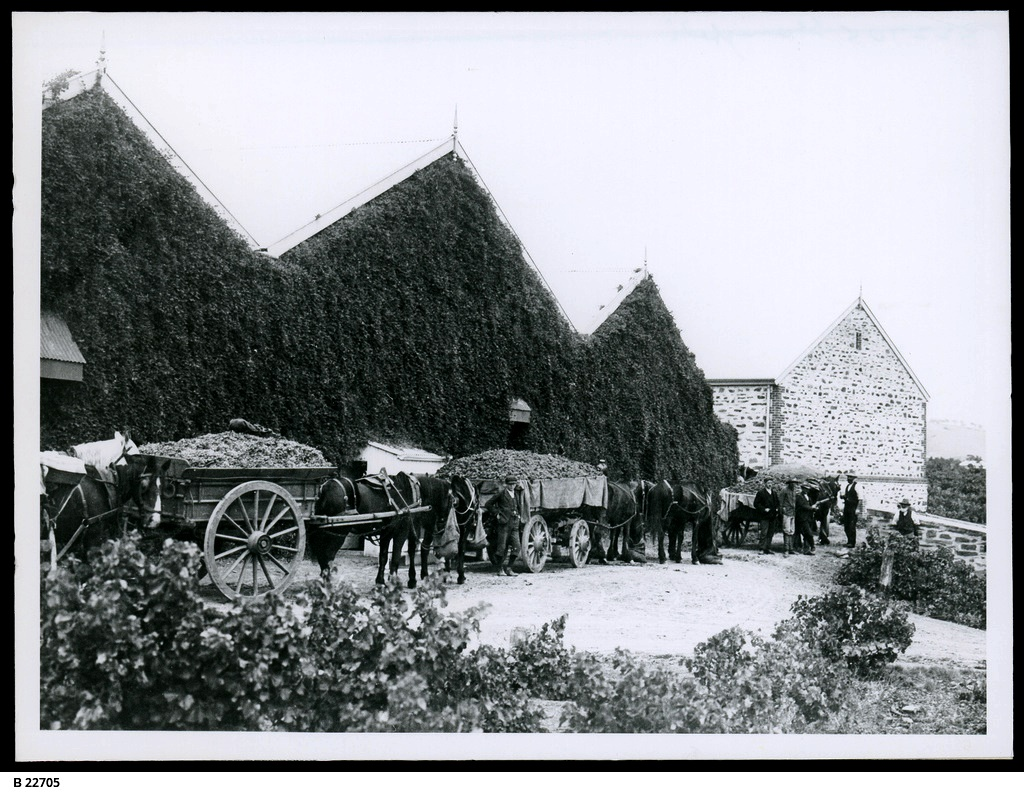
Winery, c.1920

Stonyfell took over winemaking for Arthur Formby at Langhorne Creek in 1910; in 1955 the storage was moved to Stonyfell and the grapes from the Langhorne Creek property were crushed at Stonyfell. In 1939, the winery purchased a vineyard in Rostrevor and in 1949 another property at Magill. Ronald Martin died in a car accident in 1950; in 1958 Michael Auld was managing director and John Kilgour the winemaker. By this time, the original vineyard no longer existed but was thought to be where the Stonyfell Quarry offices stood.

The great hill on the Stonyfell property was still being quarried by Dunstan's family (as Quarry Industries Ltd.) well over a century after the first rock was quarried.

In 1972, the winery was owned by Dalgety Australia, but by 1978 had been taken over by Seagram's, at which time the winemaking part of the business at Stonyfell was wound up.

The Stonyfell Restaurant opened in 1981, after a A$1-million renovation under V. Deleso, who planned to restart winery operations, using grapes from the remaining 1.6 hectares (4.0 acres) of vineyard at Stonyfell, complemented by more from Barossa Valley vineyards. Promotions manager Kevin Parker said that activities in the functions cellar (which had been open since 1975 and seated about 200 people) had continued strongly, although wine-making had declined.

The Stonyfell Winery and Vineyards were recommended for the local heritage list in 1986, at which time the premises comprised a restaurant and a small winery.

In 2001, Amphora Wine Group bought the premises, reopening the site to the public in 2007. The winery outbuildings, including the "vintage hall", were converted into a function centre for weddings and other events, However the Stonyfell Function Centre closed on 30 June 2014.

=== Clifton Manor ===
The Clifton Manor estate was established by a flour miller named George Sismey, who built the grand Gothic Revival-style mansion in 1852. The home was first leased (in 1872) and later purchased by Nathaniel Knox, who extended and developed the gardens, planting many European trees and shrubs. The estate was subdivided in 1926 and again in 1976, reducing the size to 2 acres (0.81 ha), and since then subdivided further for housing.

=== Olives ===
The Stonyfell Olive Company was founded by Joseph Crompton with William Mair and Sidney Clark in 1873, with planting continuing until 1882. By the 1900 had a 100 acres (40 ha) planted with about 10,000 olive trees, around Penfold Road. In 1901, the company employed 81 workers. This business became largely owned by the family of Owen Crompton (1875–1923) after his marriage to Sarah Simpson, daughter of A. M. Simpson, who settled on her the whole of his considerable stake in the company. With the inexorable expansion of Adelaide's suburbs, the land was sold to developers. The olive crushing plant was actually in what is now the suburb of Wattle Park, at the western end of Crompton Drive. In August 1932, the Stonyfell Olive Company was the largest producer of olive oil in South Australia, and it entered into an agreement with Bickford's (manufacturers of drinks and cordials) to do the bottling of the oil.

=== Chiverton ===
Another grand manor, Chiverton, was built in the Italianate style in 1880 for merchant John Nankivell, but he soon afterwards leased the house to Harry Bickford, the manufacturer of drinks, cordials and syrups. The house was purchased by the Anglican Community of Sisters in 1894, who established a school on the premises. In 1957 the Sisters moved their North Adelaide school, St Peter's Girls' School, to the Stonyfell building. The house, stables and coach house were made of stone from the nearby quarry, and are now heritage-listed. The house is used as the school's administration building

== Description ==
Stonyfell Creek arises on the eastern border of Stonyfell, flowing through several suburbs before joining Second Creek.

St Peter's Girls' School was founded in 1894 in North Adelaide and moved to its current site on Hallett Road in Stonyfell in 1957.

Stonyfell Wines now uses vineyards at Langhorne Creek.

There is still a quarry operating at Stonyfell as of June 2020, operated by Boral since the 1980s and extracting sandstone and quartzite.

The Stonyfell Quarry Reserve is on Penfold Road.

== Parks and reserves ==
The Ferguson Conservation Park, adjacent to St Peter's School, was dedicated as a conservation park on 2 June 1977. It is a Category III protected area. In 1980, the conservation park was listed on the former Register of the National Estate.

The Michael Perry Botanic Reserve, comprising a long strip of land along Second Creek, originally part of the Clifton Manor estate, was created in the 1970s. It is named after Michael Perry, who was a councillor, alderman and Mayor of Burnside between 1958 and 1983. A Vegetation Management Plan for the 3.2-hectare (7.9-acre) reserve was published by the council in 2012, which recommended a return to the native vegetation of the area. Restoration work has been undertaken by the council and biodiversity contractors since then. Part of the revegetation project was undertaken by a collaboration involving Burnside Council and Boral, as a corporate partner of Conservation Volunteers Australia (CVA), and 17 volunteers. More than 500 native seedlings were planted, and a new walking track was constructed in 2017. In 2019, the Michael Perry Reserve Historic Garden Adaptation Plan was developed by council, "to guide the restoration of the historic garden areas of the reserve".
