= Francis Clark and Sons =

South Australian engineering business

Francis Clark and Son was an engineering business in the early days of South Australia, which later became Francis Clark and Sons.

Francis Clark (1799–1853), previously a silversmith and magistrate in Birmingham, England, founded Francis Clark and Son, importers, with his son J. Howard Clark as accountant soon after migrating to Adelaide with his family in 1850. He then brought in A. Sidney Clark as manager, becoming Francis Clark and Sons, hardware importers and shipping agents of Blyth Street. With the death of the founder in 1853, A. Sidney Clark became sole owner, shifting the company's focus towards real estate, insurance and finance, and in 1871, with the firm of Clark and Crompton (see Henry Clark below), moved to offices in Grenfell Street close to King William Street. It narrowly survived destruction when the adjacent photographic studio of Townsend Duryea was destroyed by fire on 18 April 1875.

Properties owned by the company include a two-storey residence with stabling, etc. in Glenelg. It was the family home to George Dehane's family until around 1865, subsequently to John Colton.

They branched out into stationary engines and other machinery around 1875, with day-to-day operations managed by Joseph Horwood in premises on Gresham Street and North Terrace, moving to Blyth Street in 1878. The company was declared insolvent in 1884 but was permitted by its creditors to continue trading. In 1886, with the departure of M. Symonds Clark, it became Francis H. Clark & Co. The company ceased trading in 1893.

== The people ==
=== Francis and Caroline Clark ===
In 1824 Francis married Caroline Hill (18 August 1800 – 16 September 1877) , a daughter of Sarah (née Lea) (1765–1842) and Thomas Wright Hill (24 April 1763 – 13 June 1851) of Kidderminster, founder of what, under her brother Rowland Hill, became the Hazelwood School, Birmingham. (Rowland Hill was to become famous for inventing penny postage and was important in South Australian history as the Secretary to the Commissioners for the Colonization of South Australia.) Her eldest brother, Matthew Davenport Hill, was Recorder of Birmingham, penal reformer and a supporter of Edward Gibbon Wakefield. Both were members of the South Australian Association.

He joined the firm of William Lea & Co., silversmiths of Newhall Street, Birmingham, whose hallmark was registered at the Birmingham Assay Office in 1811, and in 1824 the hallmark of Lea & Clark was registered in Birmingham. Caroline's maternal grandfather's name was William Lea, so it is likely that the founder of the firm was her uncle.

In 1833 they moved to the old Hazelwood building, after the school had moved to "Bruce Castle", and lived there for over fifteen years. They decided to migrate to South Australia after two of their children (T. Arthur (ca.1833–1847) and F. Owen (ca.1827–1849)) had died of tuberculosis and another, John Howard, was showing signs of lung problems. Following the advice of Caroline's brothers Matthew Davenport Hill and Rowland Hill, Francis and his wife with eight children migrated to Adelaide, South Australia in the Fatima, arriving at Port Adelaide on 11 June 1850. They established a home in Goodwood.

Their children were (see below for partial biographies):

- (Caroline) Emily (1825–1911)
- A(lgernon) Sidney (1826–1908)
- Owen (1828–1849)
- J(ohn) Howard (1830–1878)
- (Lionel) Vincent (1835–1854)
- Henry Septimus (1836–1864)
- (Ellen) Rosa (1837–1899)
- M(atthew) Symonds (1839–1920)
- (Susan) Mary (1846–1932)

In 1853 Francis and son Sidney travelled to the home of John Wilkins M.D., who had been the surgeon and their travelling companion on the Fatima, in Williamstown, Victoria where he died of a heart attack on 6 March 1853. His death notice in the Register was curiously brief, with no mention of his wife and family.

During early 1853 Francis had purchased a house and 50-acre estate named "Grove Cottage" from Thomas Burr, which the Clark family re-named "Hazelwood", now Hazelwood Park. The family moved in shortly after the Francis's death and in 1858 started planting 3 acres of vines.

=== Emily Clark ===
Caroline Emily Clark (6 September 1825 – 18 November 1911) was, with help from her brother Howard, Catherine Helen Spence and others, founder of the "boarding out system" for the relief of destitute children. See main article.

=== A. Sidney Clark ===
Algernon Sidney Clark (7 December 1826 – 16 February 1908) often called simply "Sidney Clark", succeeded his father as owner and manager of the company. From 1875 to 1882 he collaborated with J. H. Horwood in the manufacture and supply of well-drilling equipment.

A. Sidney Clark was associated with the Home for Incurables and secretary of the Cremation Society. Sidney Place, Hazelwood Park is named for him.

He was a member of Adelaide City Council for Gawler Ward 1863 to 1865 and a member of its Finance committee

He helped brother Henry found Stonyfell winery and on Henry's death inherited his share (see below).

He was appointed Justice of the Peace in 1886.

He served as treasurer of the Adelaide Unitarian Christian Church in Wakefield Street.

He was chairman of the South Australian Chamber of Manufactures from 1871 to 1873.

He was member of the Adelaide Chamber of Commerce and its chairman in 1871.

He was a member of the Central Education Board from 1866 to 1868 or later.

He was an active member of the Adelaide Philosophical Society

He was a director of numerous companies, among them Mid-Moonta Mining, South Australian Coal, Burrawing Copper, Hamley Mining, Wheal Barton Copper Mining and Stonyfell Quarries.

He was a founder, with Joseph H. Haycraft of Haycraft's Gold Extraction Co. Ltd. in 1894, voluntarily liquidated in 1901.

He married Isabella "Belle" Hawkins (ca. September 1843 – 17 December 1920) at the Unitarian Church in Wakefield Street on 17 October 1867 and lived at Parkside, then "Hazelwood", later in North Adelaide.

- Mary Louisa "May" (14 August 1868 – ca.1946) married William M. Norris on 13 April 1911. Her estate was claimed by William Mackay Norris and Algernon Sidney Clark (jun).
- Edmund Sidney "Ted" Clark (15 January 1870 – 1967) married Rosanne/a? Frances ( – 24 September 1946) and lived at 82 Osmond Terrace. He was educated at Whinham College.

He founded Adelaide Electrics Works on North Terrace, which became Ellis and Clark Ltd, building their first dynamo in 1895. By 1898 Ellis and Clark had moved to Blyth Street. His children Nancy, Andrew and Philip were all brought in as employees.
Foundation secretary of the Electrical Engineers' Association in 1901.
He was a foundation member SA Institute of Engineers in 1913

- Isabel (30 September 1871 – ) married William A. Heggie on 9 April 1902
- (Fanny) Cecilia (4 November 1873 – ) married H. Mortimer White on 26 July 1906
- Catherine Ethel (20 July 1875 – 16 May 1898)
- Sybil (September 1877 – ) married John Tennant Knight on 25 November 1908
- Charles Sidney (29 November 1878 – )
- Lionel Sidney (18 December 1879 – )
- Herbert Sidney Clark (ca.1883 – ) married a daughter of architect J(ohn) Q(uinton) Bruce
- Beatrice (9 February 1883 – )
- Natalie (12 April 1884 – ) married T. H. Williams on 3 April 1912
- Algernon Sidney jun. (2 November 1887 – ) married Eleanor Ward on 19 June 1916

=== J. Howard Clark ===
John Howard Clark (15 January 1830 – 20 May 1878) was company accountant and later editor of The South Australian Register (see main article)

=== Henry Clark ===
Henry Septimus Clark (1835 – 20 February 1864) was Secretary and Engineer with East Torrens District Council, and in 1858 purchased a vineyard (which his fiancé Annie Martin named "Stonyfell") from James Edlin. He developed the vineyard in partnership with fellow-Unitarian Joseph Crompton (1842–1901), who was also his assistant at the Council and married his sister Susan. In 1862 they formed a partnership with A. Sidney Clark, trading as Clark and Crompton with offices in the same building as Francis Clark and Son, and warehouse in Blyth Street. Henry Clark died of tuberculosis on what would have been his wedding day to Annie Martin. On Henry's death, Sidney Clark inherited Henry's share of the business, which he sold to Crompton in 1873, though the business name remained "Clark and Crompton" until 1880.

=== M. Symonds Clark ===
Matthew Symonds Clark (1839 – 10 July 1920) was a student at J. L. Young's Adelaide Educational Institution, married fellow Unitarian Euphemia Martin (c. 1850 – 1 April 1941) at their Wakefield Street Church on 29 August 1874. He operated a land and estate agency at Australasia Chambers and later an accountancy business on King William Street. He was for many years secretary of the Society for the Prevention of Cruelty to Animals. He was a noted amateur ornithologist and naturalist and acted as Secretary to the Philosophical Society. His wife spent her last years active but almost totally blind. Their children included

- Caroline Clark (4 July 1875 – 12 September 1924) headmistress of Miss Martin's School and died as a result of burns
- Edward Vincent Clark (17 December 1876 – 3 October 1952) Lecturer in Electrical Engineering at University of Adelaide He married (Marion) Gwen Raws, daughter of John Garrard Raws, in London in 1919.
- Rowland Symonds Clark (22 January 1879 – 21 May 1952) married Eadith Sherard King 23 April 1906. Successful career with Queensland Insurance Company.
- (Wilfred Francis) Darwin Clark (1892 – c. 17 May 1943) Red Cross volunteer died in sinking of hospital ship AHS Centaur. Father of Rosemary and Caroline.

"Symonds" was the maiden name of his great-grandmother, Thomas Wright Hill's mother.

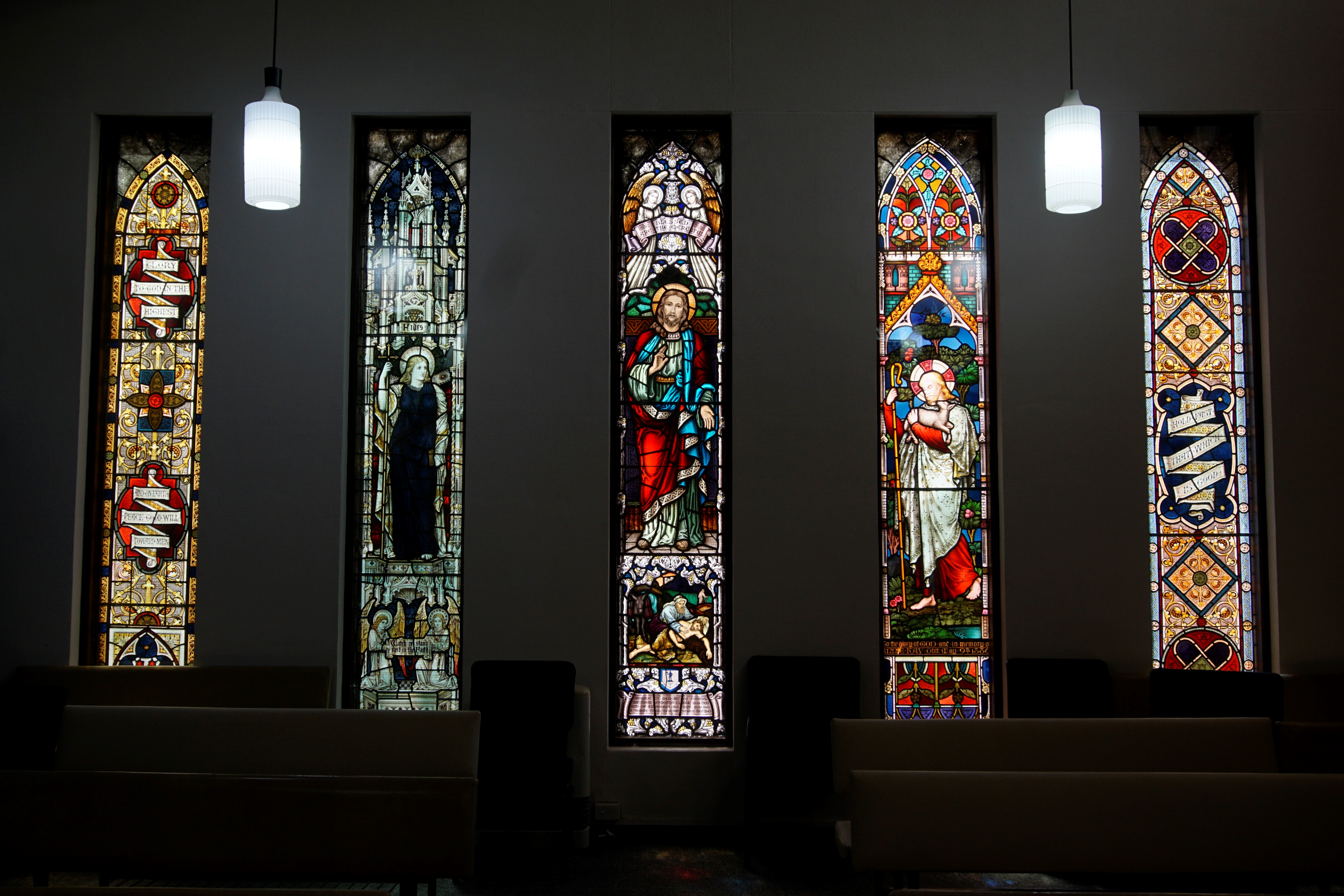
Memorial windows

A stained-glass window, depicting the Parable of the Good Samaritan, the work of Nora Burden, one of Australia's few women stained-glass artists, was in 1948 installed in the Unitarian Church, Wakefield Street, in his memory. It was incorporated into the Norwood meeting-house in the early 1970s.

=== Susan Mary Crompton ===
Susan Mary Clark (28 February 1846 – 1932) married Joseph Crompton (1840 – 27 April 1901) on 8 May 1866 She worked with sister Emily on the "boarding out system" and joined the committee of the State Children's Council in 1906, by invitation, as a replacement for her sister Emily.

=== Francis H. Clark ===
Francis Howard Clark (22 September 1859 – 17 June 1945), the elder son of J. Howard Clark, was manager of the Blyth Street showrooms and the North Terrace workshop (as F. Howard Clark and Co.) until trading ceased in 1888.

He founded an engineering shop in Port Adelaide, building windmills and various pumps of his own design. His windmill was shown at the 1879 Adelaide Industrial Exhibition; his pumps were well received at the Adelaide Exhibition in 1881. A portable steam engine and well-boring equipment won prizes at the Royal Adelaide Show in 1887.

He moved to Broken Hill and married Edith Mary Smith ( – 17 July 1950) on 5 June 1890. Later their home was "Koondi", 123 Kensington Terrace, Norwood.

== The Martins and the Clarks ==
Around six months after the Clarks left England for South Australia, Edward Montgomrey Martin (1807–1894) and his wife Ann Martin (née Thornton) (1809–1901), their family and friend William Hitchcox (1821–1902) followed on the Anglia, arriving at Port Adelaide 5 March 1851. Their children were:

- James Edward Martin (13 September 1837 – 26 September 1892)
- Lucy Martin (26 August 1839 – 3 May 1863) married John Howard Clark
- Anna Montgomerie "Annie" Montgomerie Martin (8 November 1841 – 9 August 1918)
- Susan Katherine "Susie" Martin (3 November 1843 – 24 November 1850)
- Mary Jane "Pollie" Martin (14 July 1845 – 12 July 1943) married James Arthur Whitfield (19 June 1840 – 3 January 1873) on 27 April 1871
- Henry Maydwell "Harry" Martin (1846–1936) founder of H. M. Martin and Son, winemakers
- Frederick "Fred" Martin (9 April 1848 – 27 April 1909) married writer Catherine Edith Macauley Mackay (1847 – 15 March 1937)
- Euphemia "Effie" Martin (9 October 1849 – 1 April 1941) married Matthew Symonds Clark

They soon met up with fellow-Unitarian Dr. Charles George Everard; Edward Martin rented a premises from him on Hindley Street, where he established a chemists shop, and bought an allotment at Osmond Terrace, Norwood, where they built a house. They soon made friends of the Clarks and the friendship endured, four pairing up:

- Lucy married John Howard Clark in 1858.
- Annie was engaged to Henry Septimus Clark, but he died of tuberculosis on the day they would have been married.
- Harry married Ellen Rosa Clark in 1874.
- Effie married Matthew Symonds Clark in 1874.

== First night game at Adelaide Oval ==
The company was responsible for the first electric lighting system ever installed at Adelaide Oval, for an Australian Rules football match between Adelaide and South Adelaide on 1 July 1885 commencing 8pm. The company supplied six electric arc-lamps, three on either side of the ground, and having two steam-powered dynamos for each three. Four lamps were 1,000 candle-power of Brush manufacture and two of 2,000 candle-power by Siemens. The lamps were mounted on 30-feet poles equally spaced around the Oval just outside the boundary flags. The game was well attended but the illumination proved inadequate for a full enjoyment of the game (especially when the ball's white paint wore off!) and there were momentary lamp failures. Adelaide won the game 1 goal 8 behinds to 8 behinds.

== Memorabilia ==
The old hand pump on display in the Market Square in Burra and a crane displayed at Port Adelaide were products of the company.

A display of gold mining equipment in Pine Creek, Northern Territory features a company advertisement of the period.
