= Crompton and Sons =

Companies based in Adelaide (1840–1901)

- Born: 17 January 1840; Liverpool, England
- Died: 27 April 1901 (aged 61)

Joseph Crompton (17 January 1840 – 27 April 1901) was a vigneron, manufacturer and exporter who founded several companies in the early days of the colony of South Australia. The eastern foothills suburb of Stonyfell was named after the property he bought in 1858, on which vineyards were established. Stonyfell Winery still exists today, although the grapes are sourced from Langhorne Creek. Crompton also established olive groves and set up businesses manufacturing soap, and exporting animal skins and plant resins to Britain.

== History ==
He was born in Liverpool, England, the youngest of the four sons of Woodhouse Crompton and his wife Lucy (née Fletcher). After the death of his parents, he was brought up by his maternal aunts at Rivington Hall, the Fletcher family home in Lancashire. After attending a boarding school in Knutsford he decided to emigrate to South Australia in the hope of improving his health and making a fortune. To help in this second ambition he carried an introduction to the family of Francis Clark, who were also Unitarians, as he was.

He sailed on SS Great Britain, arriving in Melbourne on 24 September 1860 and Adelaide a month later.

In Adelaide, he found employment working with Henry Septimus Clark in his capacity as engineer and secretary for the East Torrens District Council, and took over many of his duties, while forming a close friendship. (This council covered the area from the East Parklands to the Mount Lofty Ranges and as far north as Norton Summit.)

=== Wine ===
In 1857 Henry bought an Adelaide Hills property, dubbed "Stonyfell" (meaning "rocky hill") by his fiancée, Annie Montgomery Martin. Together with Henry Clark, Crompton established Stonyfell Vineyards in 1858, and by 1862 he and Robert Slape had planted some 34 acres (14 ha) of vines and largely completed the two-storey cellars. On 21 May 1862 Henry formed a partnership with his brother Sidney and Joseph Crompton. Henry died in 1864 and in 1873 Joseph (who had meanwhile married Susan Mary Clark) bought out Sidney's share, becoming sole owner, but retained the business name "Clark & Crompton" until 1880. Joseph and his family moved into Stonyfell Cottage which had been built in 1838 by the previous owner James Edlin. According to Department of Mines records, there was a quarry opened in 1837 by James Edlin in the area, to supply slate and building stone.

In 1901 the whole family, with the exception of H. W. Crompton, was still living there.

Clark & Crompton employed as winemaker Henry Tyler, who produced a dry red Burgundy, a dry white Hock, a light red and a Muscat from their own and other growers' grapes, producing in the 1870s around 9,000 imperial gallons (41,000 L; 11,000 US gal) each vintage. With the sale of the property in 1888, Francis Crompton had no further interest in winemaking, but Henry Martin and his son Ronald took over the winemaking business from Dunstan in 1902 and in 1934 purchasing vineyards and cellars from the Dunstan estate.

=== Olives ===
In 1874 he founded the Stonyfell Olive Company Ltd. with William Mair and Sidney Clark on 130 acres (53 ha) of Stonyfell land. This business became largely owned by the family of Owen Crompton after his marriage to Sarah Simpson, daughter of A. M. Simpson, who settled on her the whole of his considerable stake in the company. With the inexorable expansion of Adelaide's suburbs, the land was sold to developers.

=== Wool and leather ===
In 1878 he began exporting skins to Britain and in 1879 he bought a 10-acre (4.0 ha) property in what is now Beverley, South Australia for stabilising hides and skins for export to English fellmongers. In 1882 he opened a similar establishment in Footscray, Victoria.

At one stage Cromptons were exporting 1000 bales of rabbit skins annually, or 150 tons per week.

He is believed to have been the first to export kangaroo skins to England, sometime before 1883, to Booth and Company (England) Ltd. Over 80,000 skins were exported to the same company in 1952.

=== Other raw materials ===
For a considerable time Cromptons were exporting accroides resin from the yacca plant (Xanthorrhoea spp.), obtained when Kangaroo Island land was being cleared; in one year 1200 tons were exported. This resource is effectively non-renewable, as the plant is extremely slow growing.

=== Soap ===
In 1878 Joseph founded the Bunyip Soap factory on 53 acres (21 ha) to the south of Port Pirie. In 1889 the factory moved to the banks of the Torrens on Winwood Street, Southwark, previously occupied by T. Cornish's tannery, where it was managed by J. Milbourne, previously with the Apollo Soapworks then J. Kitchen and Sons. The company was still operating from the same premises, adjacent to F. H. Faulding Ltd., in 1962. The name Bunyip Soap Company was registered in 1898 and from c. 1955 as Crompton Bunyip Soaps Ltd until c. 1991 when the firm went into voluntary liquidation.

Around 1900, Bunyip Soaps opened an office in Perth and had a factory at 25 Cliff Street, Fremantle in the first half of the 20th century.

=== Grazing ===
He leased a 500-square-mile (1,300 km^{2}) property near Keith, South Australia where he grazed sheep, later selling the 300,000 acres (120,000 ha) for £6000.

=== Farming ===
He purchased a dairy farm of 116 acres (47 ha) on Port Road, Woodville, South Australia, and purchased 500 acres (200 ha) at Carrickalinga near Myponga, South Australia.

== Depression ==
Like John Barton Hack in the 1840 depression, Francis Crompton was ill-equipped to weather the financial downturn of 1884–1885. His assets were too diverse and widespread and he was forced to relinquish Carrickalinga and Stonyfell to the Bank of Adelaide, but retaining the Stonyfell house. In 1888 the property was purchased by quarry operator Henry Dunstan, who took on Henry Martin as his secretary and accountant. The business was known as H. M. Martin and Son. The great hill on the Stonyfell property was still being quarried by Dunstan's family (as Quarry Industries Ltd.) well over a century later.

The same year, Joseph sold the house "Ilfracombe" on the Stonyfell Road to Henry Martin. This property was built for James George Nash F.R.C.S., the Colonial Surgeon, and later owned by pastoralist John Hallett.

== Family ==
Joseph Crompton married (Susan) Mary Clark (28 February 1846 – 20 July 1932) at the Unitarian Christian Church in Wakefield Street on 8 May 1866. Mary Crompton worked with her sister Emily Clark on the boarding-out committee and succeeded her on the State Children's Council in 1906.

They had ten children:

- Henry Woodhouse Crompton (28 June 1867 – 10 November 1946) studied law, married Kate Brooke "Katie" Smith (c. 1868 – 12 September 1948) on 18 May 1893, was manager of the Olive Company 1889, and managing director of the Bunyip Soap Company. Lived at Northumberland St, Heathpool
- (Caroline) Lucy Crompton (31 July 1868 – 1956)
- Martha "Patty" Crompton (26 February 1870 – 1962)
- Alfred "Alf" Crompton (17 January 1872 – 1963)
- Dorothea "Dora" Crompton (1873 – c. 6 October 1881)
- Owen Crompton (1875–1923) married Sarah Simpson, daughter of Alfred M. Simpson of Young House, Parkside, on 27 September 1904. He was manager of the Olive Company (1899– ) and owner of Alma Chambers.
- Robert "Bob" Crompton (1878–1958) manager Olive Company 1923 –
- Thomas Edwin "Tom" Crompton (30 April 1880 – 1960) owner of Adelaide Arcade 1919–??
- Bernard "Bun" Crompton (7 July 1882 – 1945)
- Harriet Mary "Hetty" Crompton (11 February 1884 – )
- John William Crompton (1885–1966)

Joseph Crompton suffered a form of paralysis from 1889 to 1891, and it was a recurrence of this which killed him in 1901.
