= Woffinden =

Woffinden is a surname. Notable people with the surname include:

- Bob Woffinden (1948–2018), British investigative and music journalist
- John Woffinden (born 1952), South Australian sculptor
- Tai Woffinden (born 1990), British speedway rider
