= Geoffrey Richard Shedley =

Australian architect and sculptor (1914–1981)

Geoffrey Richard Shedley (10 May 1914 – 19 August 1981) was a South Australian architect and sculptor.

== History ==
Shedley was born in Glenelg, South Australia, the only son of Richard Gustav (later Richard Graham) "Gus" Schedlich (1886–1931) and his wife Louie Polmear Schedlich, née Maddern (1884–1949). Their surname was anglicized shortly after, during WWI. He was educated at St Peter's College, also taking classes at the South Australian School of Arts and Crafts. He joined the architectural firm of H. H. Cowell, and studied architecture at the School of Mines 1932–1936.

In 1937 he won a competition for design of a low-cost pair of attached houses for the South Australian Housing Trust, which became the first of several designs for "austerity" family homes, which with inversions and other variations totalled 150 "Cowell home" designs, realized as part of Premier Playford's plan to convert South Australia from a dependence on diverse rural production to a centralized industrial State, by attracting young skilled migrants from the UK and Europe.

Apart from cheese-paring design and use of standardized, locally made, components and materials, much of the cost saving construction lay in the houses being complete to "lockup" stage, with bare floors, doors and window frames primed but unpainted, and bare ground for a garden, relying on the purchaser or renter for improvements as time and finances permitted.

Shedley was registered as an architect in 1941, became an Associate of the Royal Australian Institute of Architects in 1946 and left Cowell for the Housing Trust in 1947, and was largely responsible for design of the satellite town of Elizabeth. He retired in 1974.

He designed and helped build several private houses.

== Recognition ==
The Shedley Theatre in Elizabeth was named for him.

== Works of art ==
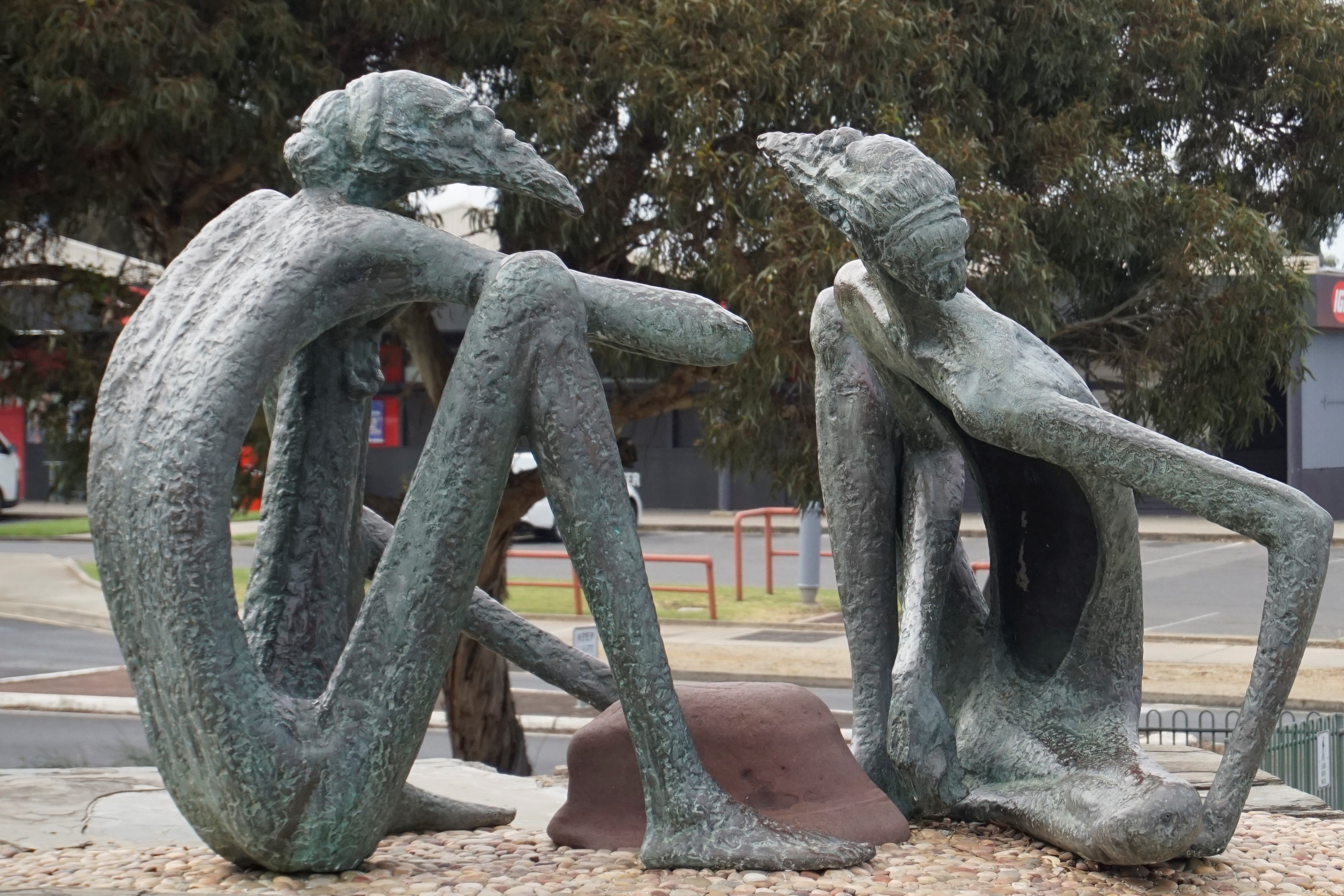
The Rainmakers

Shedley modelled the figures on the Elizabeth fountain at Windsor Green and the council chambers. He designed street floats for the Adelaide Festival of Arts in 1960 and 1962. He created the massive bas relief fountain sculpture Fire and Earth, a feature of the pond at Windsor Green, Elizabeth. He created the sculpture The Rainmakers, the first major public artwork in South Australia to depict traditional Aboriginals, sponsored by Eugen Lohmann of Remscheid-Lennep, West Germany, and unveiled at Christies Beach on 21 May 1965. While on overseas trips he purchased various works for the Art Gallery of South Australia.

His painting The Parable of the Blind Men is held by the Art Gallery of South Australia.

Geoffrey and Mary Shedley were members of "Group 9", founded by Dorrit Black, whose members included Lisette Kohlhagen, Mary Harris, Ernst Milston, Marjorie Gwynne, John Dowie and Ruby Henty, all members of the Royal South Australian Society of Arts. Shedley was, with his friend Dowie, a member of Adelaide's Savage Club.

== Family ==
On 10 April 1942 Shedley married Mary Hackett, a fellow art student; they had three daughters. While living at Glenelg, he planned and built their family home at 12 Royal Avenue, Burnside. He died of a cerebral haemorrhage on 19 August 1981 at Toorak Gardens and was buried in the cemetery at St Jude's Church, Brighton.
