= Unitarian Church of South Australia =

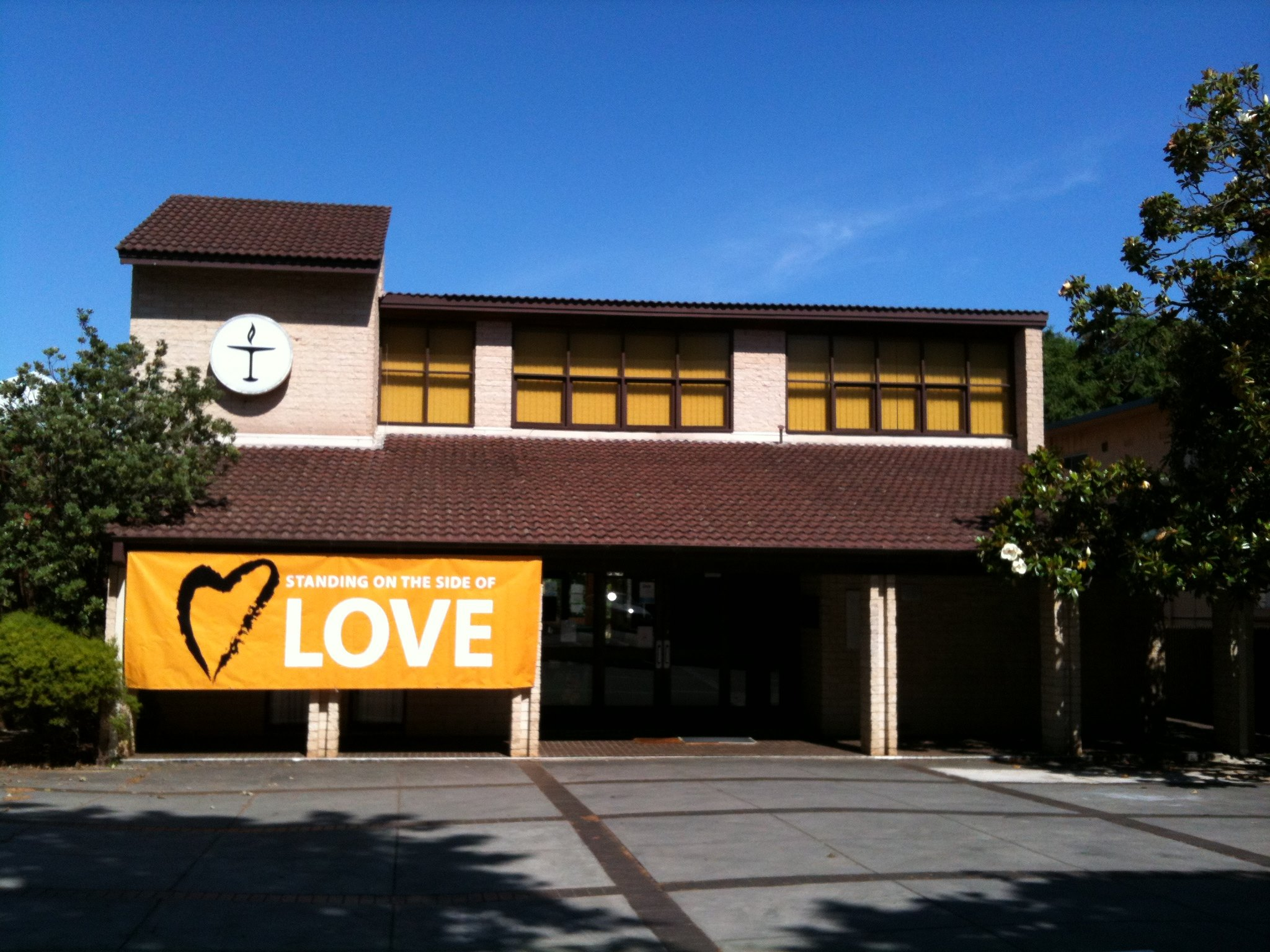
- Location: 99 Osmond Terrace, Norwood, South Australia
- Country: Australia
- Denomination: Unitarian Universalist
- Website: http://unitariansa.org.au/

History
- Founded: 1855

The Unitarian Church of South Australia, Inc., is an independent and self-governed church affiliated with the worldwide Unitarian Universalist movement and an affiliate member of the Unitarian Universalist Association. It is a socially progressive and inclusive spiritual community, not covenanted by doctrine and dogma, but by liberal religious principles distilled from the essential values of all world religions, as well as the arts, humanities, and sciences.

== History ==
=== Wakefield Street ===
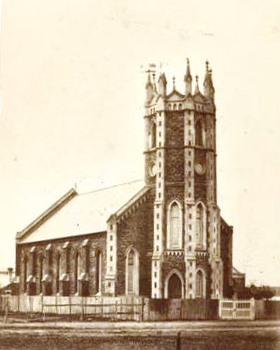
Unitarian Christian Church, Wakefield Street, Adelaide c. 1865

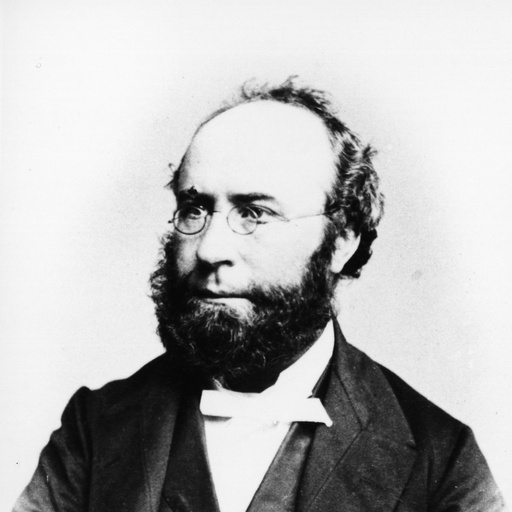
The first minister of the church, J. Crawford Woods, c. 1865

On July 11, 1854, a group of people of the Unitarian Christian denomination met in Adelaide, South Australia and resolved to found their own church and seek a suitable minister from England. John Crawford Woods was selected and arrived on the Quito from London on 19 September 1855. Services were initially held in private houses until October of that year, when the first public service was held in King William Street, Adelaide.

The congregation opened a church in Wakefield Street in 1857. Members of the congregation included prominent South Australians such as Premier of South Australia Sir Henry Ayers, industrialist Alfred Muller Simpson, newspaper editor John Howard Clark and librarian Robert Kay, who was active in the cause of popular education. Writer, teacher, politician, and suffragette Catherine Helen Spence joined the church in 1856, later preaching there occasionally. As a lay leader, she lobbied for greater opportunities for women in education, employment, and political participation. Membership peaked at around 750 in 1881.

Woods resigned in 1887 but it was two years before a suitable replacement was found in the Rev. Robert Cooper Dendy of Tenterden, Kent, and Woods continued serving until May 1889. Dendy left in 1893 and was replaced by Rev. Alexander Wilson, who resigned in 1902.

=== Shady Grove ===
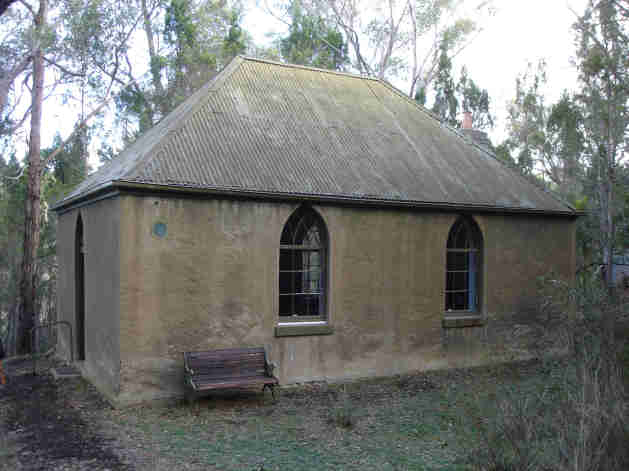
Unitarian Church of South Australia's Shady Grove chapel

In 1858, British immigrant John Monks and his sons set about building a school on a Shady Grove property, near Hahndorf in the Adelaide Hills. Later, this building and the surrounding land, including a cemetery, were gifted to the Unitarian Church of South Australia and converted into a branch chapel. On Christmas Eve 1865, the Rev. J. Crawford Woods, from the larger church, officiated at an opening event. From the chapel's founding in 1865 to 1881, Francis Duffield was the first official lay leader of the Shady Grove congregation.

Today, the property is listed on the South Australia Heritage Register. The property remains primarily virgin scrub and grows many wildflowers. A team of bush care workers meet regularly to maintain the property. The Shady Grove chapel is still used regularly by a small but active congregation.

== Recent years ==
In the twentieth century, the fortunes of the congregation fluctuated, largely depending on the resident minister. Rev George Hale, while highly regarded for his integrity and oratory, alienated many for his pacifist stance during WWII. The Wakefield Street church, one of Adelaide's more impressive religious buildings in its day, became in the 1960s increasingly expensive to maintain so the congregation decided to move to a more suitable premises in the suburbs. The property was sold to the South Australian Public Service Association in 1971, and the building demolished in 1973.

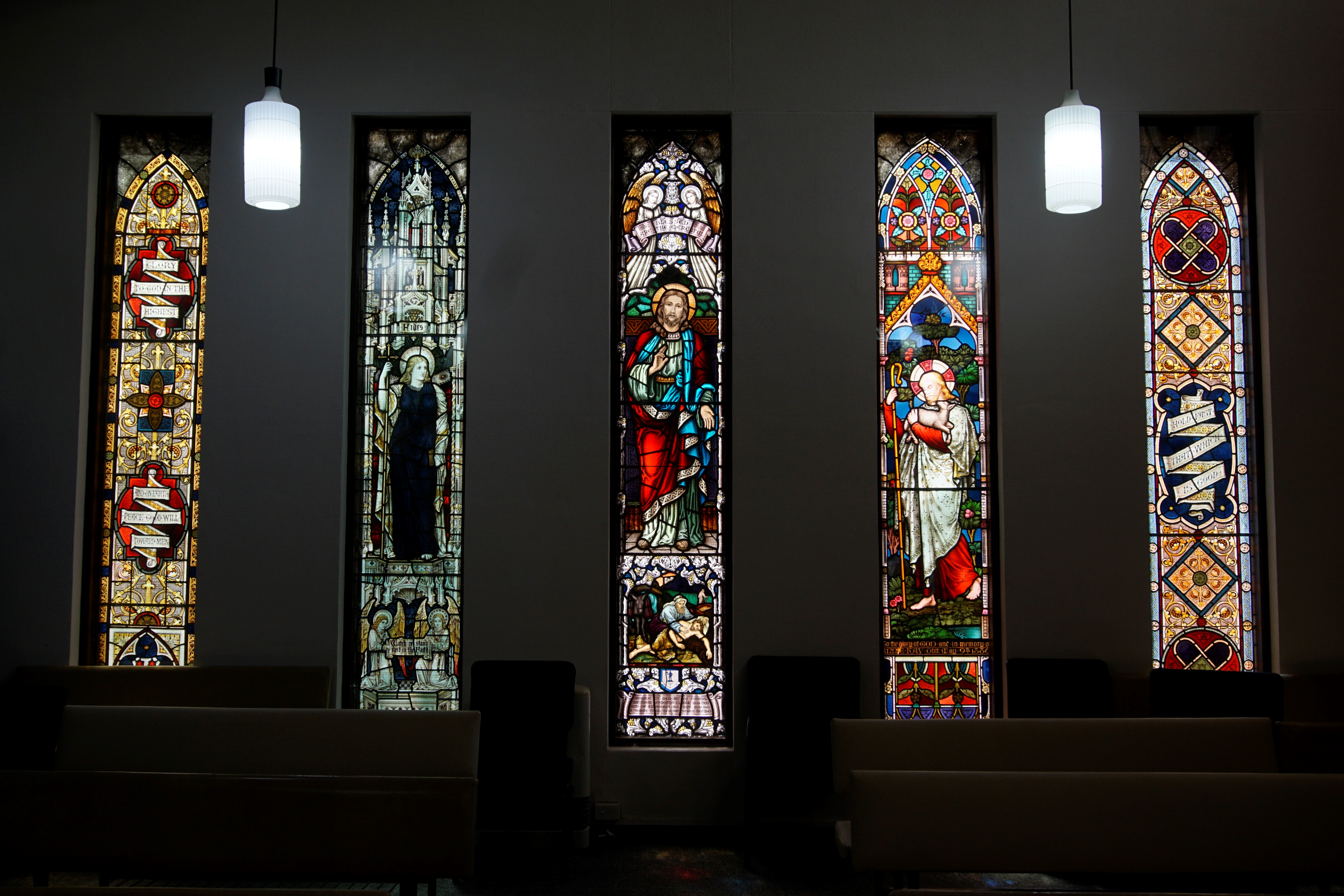
Memorial windows

The new Meeting House in suburban Norwood, South Australia, with an adjoining manse for the minister, was designed by architect Eric von Schramek in 1970. The stained glass windows and the organ from the old church were incorporated into the interior decoration of the new building. Weekly Sunday morning services are held at the Norwood Meeting House.

The congregation removed "Christian" from the church's name in 1977. As of 2018, the congregation holds two services per week and engages in community outreach, particularly focused on social justice issues. At the 2021 census, there were 830 Unitarian Universalist adherents in Australia, of whom about one third reside in South Australia.

In 1998 the artist John Dowie, a member of the congregation, donated a large oil painting to the church, which was hung behind the lecturne, later moved to another wall of the auditorium.

== Some ministers of the church ==
(from publication "Information on the Adelaide Unitarian Church")

- 1855–1889 Rev. John Crawford Woods

Woods had long periods of absence notably filled by C. H. Spence and

- 1875–1876 Rev. Charles L. Whitham
- 1889–1893 Rev. R. C. Dendy
- 1893–1902 Rev. Alexander Wilson
- 1902–1907 Rev. John Reid
- 1908–1918 Rev. Wilfred Harris
- 1919–1920 Rev. Wynham Heathcote
- 1921–1945 Rev. George Hale
- 1946–1948 Rev. Allan Brown
- 1949–1961 Rev. Colin Gibson
- 1962–1966 Rev. Hugh Weston
- 1968–1984 Rev. Allen Kirby
- 1984^{*} Rev. Kenn G. Hunto
- 1984^{*} Rev. David Usher
- 1985^{*} Rev. Dr George N. Marshall
- 1985^{*} Rev. Dr Roberta K. Mitchell
- 1985^{*} Rev. Dr Peter H. Samson
- 1985^{*} Rev. Robert C. Palmer
- 1986^{*} Rev. Dr David C. Pohl
- 1986^{*} Rev. Polly L. Guild
- 1986^{*} Rev. Dr John M. Wells
- 1986^{*} Rev. Michael A. McGee
- 1987^{*} Rev. Dr Robert F. Kaufmann
- 1987^{*} Rev. Farley W. Wheelwright

^{*} denotes interim ministries of around 3 months

- 1987–1988 Rev. Dr Max Gaebler
- 1988–19XX Rev. Eric Heller-Wagner

== Gallery ==
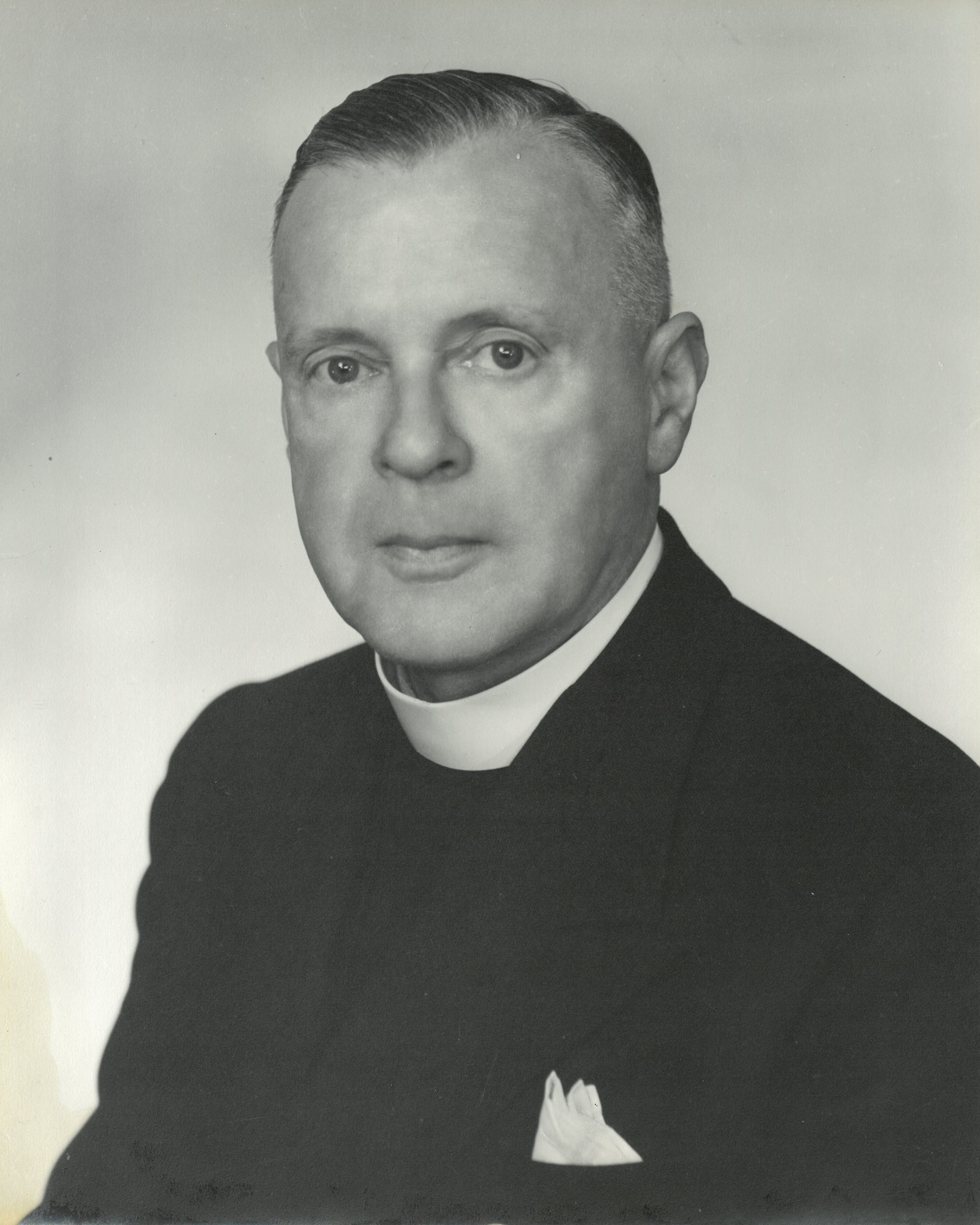
George E. Hale

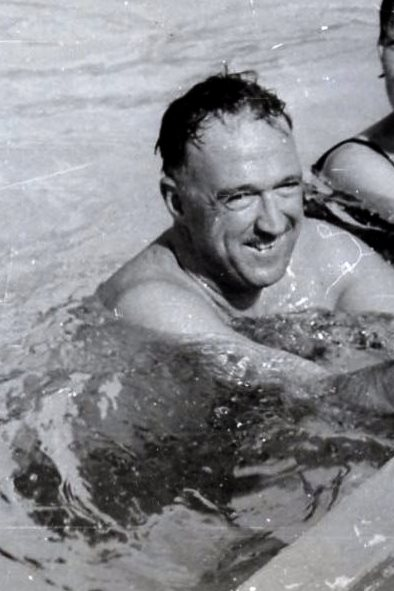
Hugh Weston
