= The Unitarian Painting =

Artwork by John Dowie

The Unitarian Painting is the title given by artist John Dowie to the large oil painting in the auditorium of the Unitarian Church of South Australia. Dowie was a member of the church, for which body he created and donated the painting.

Painting by John Dowie

== The painting ==
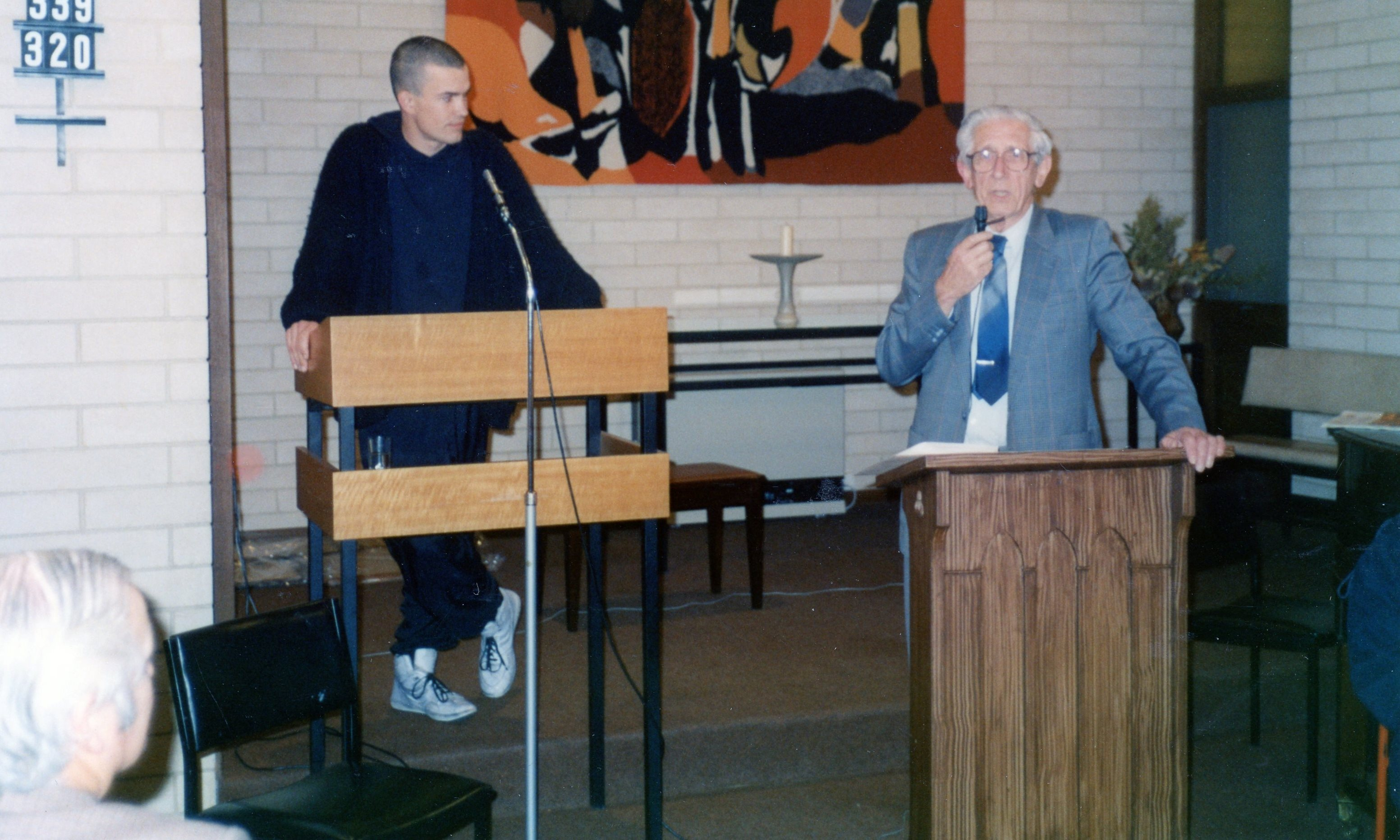
Quiz night at the church, c. 1995 Walter Welburn (died 2006) was QM (abstract tapestry partly visible)

For many years the principal decoration of the church was a tapestry Proserpine (Persephone) of abstract design, woven 1971–1972 by senior members of the church, including Jean Rouse and Marjorie Buring, later Furness.

Sometime in the 1990s Dowie, who was a recent addition to the congregation, offered to contribute an artwork of more relevance to the history and philosophy of the church, and discussed designs with the then minister, Rev. Allen Kirby, and members of the congregation including Mrs Audrey Abbie and Mrs Peg Dowie.

The central motif of the painting, barely visible near top left, is the flaming chalice, the symbol of unitarian-universalist congregations. To Dowie it represented "the truth, whatever it may be, received as we perceive it." The historical characters depicted in the painting are, from back and left to right:

- Rev John Crawford Woods, first minister of the Adelaide congregation
- Michael Servetus, Spanish martyr
- James Martineau, English minister and philosopher
- Joseph Priestley, English scientist and minister
- Sir Isaac Newton, English scientist and philosopher
- Caroline Emily Clark, Australian worker for welfare of children
- Catherine Helen Spence, Australian activist for democracy and human rights

The painting was officially presented to the church on Easter Sunday 12 April 1998. Rev. Mark Allstrom officiated at its hanging. Its original placement was behind the lectern; what might elsewhere be called an altarpiece. It has subsequently been moved to a less dominant location, on another wall of the auditorium. The abstract tapestry subsequently hung in the room named for the greatly loved Shirley Beckwith (1918–1975).
