= Lisette Kohlhagen =

Australian artist (1890–1969)

Lisette Anna Kohlhagen (20 December 1890 – 2 February 1969) was a South Australian artist.

== History ==
Lisette was born at Kilkerran, near Maitland, South Australia on Yorke Peninsula, the youngest child of Johann Friedrich Christian Kohlhagen (1846–1910) and his wife Anna Maria Kohlhagen née Hoffrichter (1848–1905).

She studied at the South Australian School of Arts and Crafts in Adelaide under James Ashton and Miss McNamara, winning an award from the Royal Drawing Society in 1926, as did fellow student Ivor Hele In 1927 she and her sister Emma Adeline toured the galleries of Britain and Europe. and took the opportunity to study with Gratton Cooke at the R.D.S. She studied oil painting under Adelaide Perry in Sydney in 1935 and later, around 1937–1938, at George Bell's School, 443 Bourke Street, Melbourne.

She was a longtime member of the South Australian Society of Arts, and their secretary from 1947 to 1954, and a worker for the Liberal and Country League, to which party she made generous donations of artwork.

She was a member of the self-styled "Group 9", whose members included Dorrit Black, Mary Harris, Geoffrey Shedley, Mary Shedley, Ernst Milston, Marjorie Gwynne, John Dowie and Ruby Henty. She was a foundation member of the SA branch of the Contemporary Art Society, wrote art criticism for the Adelaide News, and a volunteer guide and lecturer for the Art Gallery of South Australia.

Kohlhagen Street in the Canberra suburb of Conder is named in her honour.
