= John Dowie (artist) =

Australian painter, sculptor and teacher

John Dowie AM
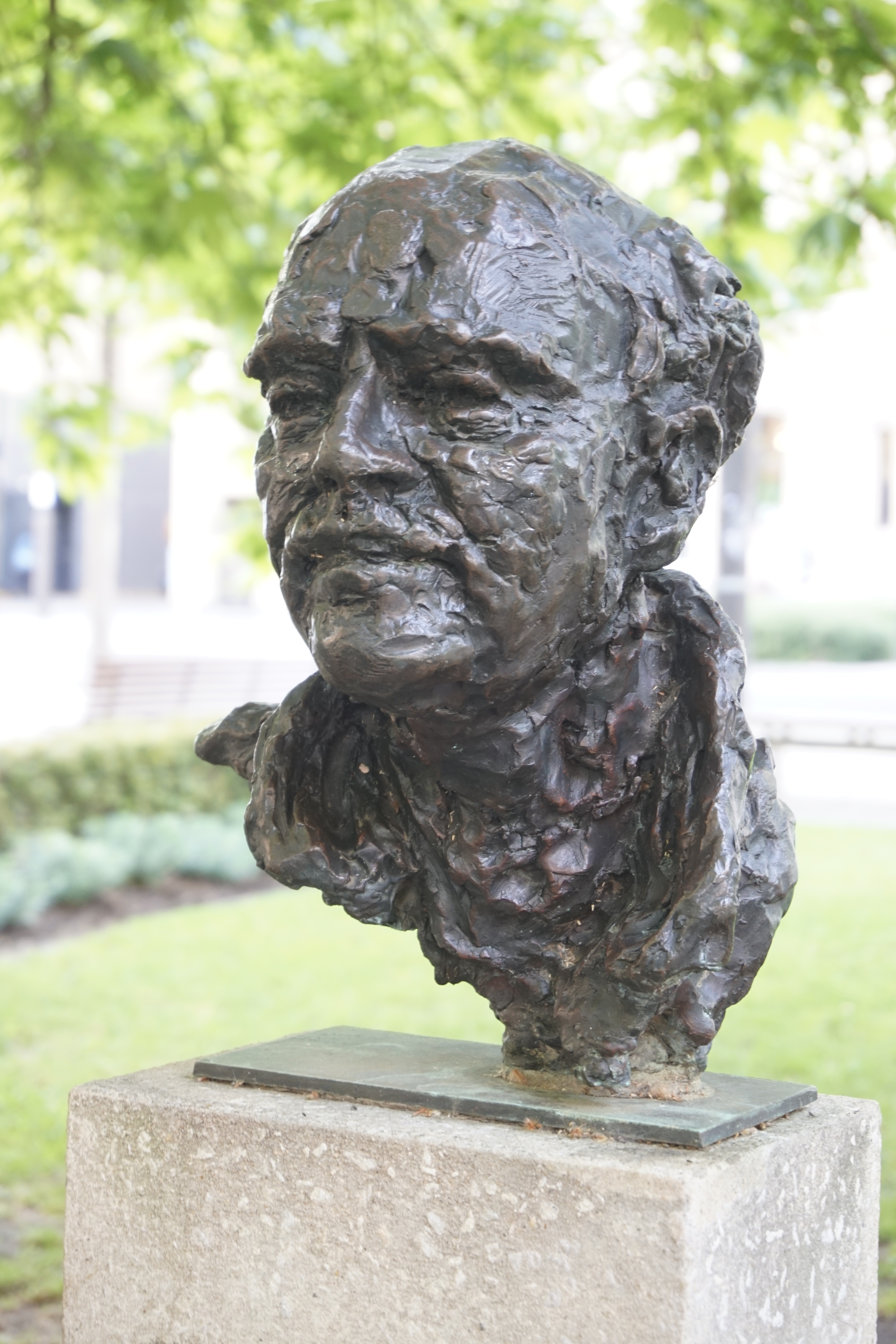
- Bust of John Dowie by John Woffinden (2006)
- Born: 15 January 1915; Prospect, South Australia
- Died: 19 March 2008 (aged 93); Adelaide, South Australia
- Occupations: Painter and sculptor
- Known for: Three Rivers in Victoria Square, Adelaide, many other public sculptures in Adelaide

John Stuart Dowie AM (15 January 1915 – 19 March 2008) was an Australian painter, sculptor, and teacher. His work includes over 50 public sculpture commissions, including the "Three Rivers" fountain in Victoria Square, "Alice" in Rymill Park, the "Victor Richardson Gates" at Adelaide Oval and the "Sir Ross & Sir Keith Smith Memorial" at Adelaide Airport.

== Early life and education ==
John Stuart Dowie was born in the Adelaide suburb of Prospect, a son of Charles Stuart Dowie (c. 1874–1937) and his wife Gertrude Phillis Dowie, née Davey (1881–1956), who married in 1910. His siblings were David Lincoln Dowie (1911–1991), Jean Phillis Dowie (1913–2010), and Donald Alexander "Don" Dowie (1917–2016). The family moved to the leafy suburb of Dulwich in 1917.

He attended Rose Park Primary School and Adelaide High School before studying architecture at the University of Adelaide and painting at the South Australian School of Art; teachers included Ivor Hele and Marie Tuck. Between 1936 and 1940 he studied architecture at the University of Adelaide, immersed in the avant-garde movement then prevalent; he designed the cover for Phoenix, which gave rise to Angry Penguins. He contributed eight linocuts to Phoenix in 1935 and 1936.

== Wartime service ==
Dowie enlisted with the 2nd AIF in 1940, serving in the 2/43rd Battalion. He fought in the Siege of Tobruk, where the Allied soldiers were dubbed "The Rats of Tobruk".

He next worked in the Military History Unit of the 2nd AIF as an assistant to Australia's first official war sculptor, Lyndon Dadswell. In 1943 he returned to his old Battalion, serving at Finschhafen, New Guinea.

== Career ==
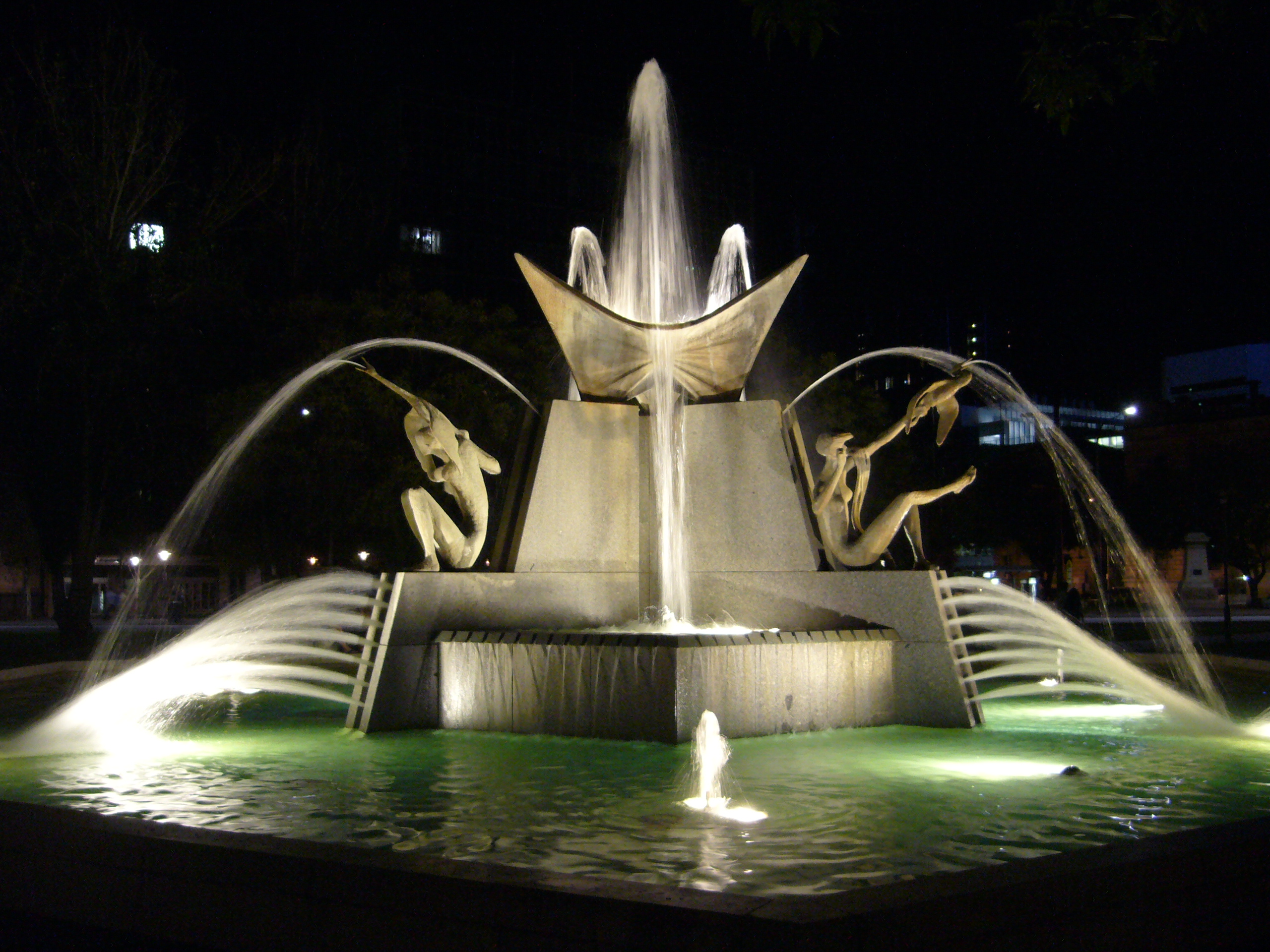
John Dowie's sculpture Three Rivers in Victoria Square, Adelaide

After studying art in London and Florence, Dowie returned to Australia and became a member of the Royal South Australian Society of Arts and Dorrit Black's "Group 9", which included Geoffrey Shedley and Mary Shedley, Lisette Kohlhagen, Mary Harris, Ernst Milston, Marjorie Gwynne, and Ruby Henty.

One of his earliest commissions was from Adelaide architect D. P. Michelmore for the Ross and Keith Smith memorial, first installed outside the Vickers-Vimy hangar at the domestic terminal, West Beach Airport (since renamed Adelaide Airport). A massive undertaking, it consists of four oversize standing figures in high relief, carved in Gosford sandstone, overall size 3.36 by 2.74 metres (11.0 ft × 9.0 ft), and was unveiled on 27 April 1958. It now stands outside the Vickers-Vimy Memorial at the east end of the new terminal.

He created dozens of statues, mostly in bronze, of prominent figures, none more so perhaps than the bust of Elizabeth II, who sat for him on five occasions in 1987 in the Yellow Drawing Room at Buckingham Palace. Dowie modelled directly in clay, from which he made plaster moulds (at the Palace) which were sent to the Meridian Sculpture Foundry, (Note: Not to be confused with the foundry of the same name in Peckham Rye, London, the Fitzroy workshops were established in 1973 by Peter Morley, who trained in England.) Fitzroy, Melbourne, to be cast in bronze using the lost-wax process, in time for the official opening of New Parliament House, Canberra in March 1988.

== Recognition and honours ==
Dowie was made a Member of the Order of Australia (AM) in 1981 in recognition of his service to the arts as a sculptor and painter.

In 2004 he was awarded an honorary doctorate by the University of Adelaide, "for his contribution to the spiritual and artistic life of Adelaide and the nation".

He was named Senior Australian of the Year for South Australia in 2005.

A bust of Dowie, sculpted in 2006 by another South Australian sculptor, John Woffinden, stands in front of the State Library of South Australia on North Terrace in Adelaide.

== Personal life ==
After the death of his mother Dowie purchased the family home at 28 Gurney Road, Dulwich. Dowie never married. The painter Helen Alexandra "Penny" Dowie is a niece, daughter of Donald Alexander "Don" and Margaret "Peg" Dowie, née Burden,

He was a regular attendee at the Unitarian Church on Osmond Terrace in Norwood. One of his paintings, described as a "large colourful painting depicting liberal religion" adorns the church.

== Death ==
Dowie had a stroke which took his speech away two years before his death. However, he continued to communicate by means of his intonation, gestures, and facial expressions.

He died on 19 March 2008, aged 93, in an Adelaide nursing home, after suffering another stroke the week before.

He was given a state funeral in March 2008 and a memorial service for him was held in Bonython Hall at the University of Adelaide on 22 April 2008.

He was buried in a country churchyard near Littlehampton, South Australia.

== Works ==
Partial list of public works by John Dowie:

Name	Year	Location	Notes
Soldier	1955	Roseworthy College chapel	
Ross and Keith Smith	1958	Adelaide Airport	sandstone bas relief
Platypus fountain	1960	Raleigh Walk, Elizabeth	in pool designed by Geoff Shedley
Piccaninny drinking fountain	1960	Rymill Park, Adelaide	
Hans Heysen	1961	Hahndorf Academy	duplicate at "The Cedars"
Alice	1961	Rymill Park, Adelaide	
Pan fountain	1962	Veale Gardens, Adelaide	
Kangaroo and Platypus	1963	Hemel Hempstead, UK	a gift from the town of Elizabeth, SA
Stilt Boy	1963	Adelaide High School	
Father and Son	1964	Garema Place, Canberra	
Professor Hubert Edwin Whitfeld	1964	University of Western Australia	
Howard Florey	1966	North Terrace, Adelaide	
Vic Richardson gates	1967	Adelaide Oval	
Three Rivers fountain	1968	Victoria Square, Adelaide	
Charles Bean	1969	Australian War Memorial, Canberra	
Mellis Napier	1970	North Terrace, Adelaide	
Edward Morgan	1970	Art Gallery of South Australia	
Icarus	1971	Melbourne Airport, Melbourne	
Tjilbruke	1972	Kingston Park, South Australia	assemblage of gneiss boulders
The Art of Learning	1972	University of South Australia, Mawson Lakes	85 relief mullions from four designs
Keith Russack memorial	1972	Adelaide High School	
Lachlan Macquarie	1973	FAI Insurance building, Macquarie Street, Sydney	
Thomas Playford	1973	Parliament House, Adelaide	
Memorial (to whom?)	1974	St Columba's Church, Hawthorn, Adelaide	bronze aumbry and plaque
George the orangutan	1976	Adelaide Zoo	
The Slide	1977	Rundle Mall, Adelaide	
Mark Oliphant	1978	North Terrace, Adelaide	
Child with hula hoop	1978	Nurses memorial gardens	
Zelman Cowen	1979	University of Queensland, Brisbane	
Hamish Bruce memorial gate	1980s	St Peter's College, Adelaide	depicts discus, rowing, football
Mildred Mocatta fountain	1980s	Hackney, Adelaide	
2/43 Battalion memorial cairn	1980	Woodside army camp	
John Hackett	1980	Geelong Grammar School	
Thomas & Co. fountain	1981	Port Adelaide	
Douglas Mawson	1982	North Terrace, Adelaide	duplicate at Mawson Base, Antarctica
Elizabeth II	1984	Queen's Place, Brisbane	
Robert Richard Torrens	1985	South Australian Parliament Research Library	duplicate at Scotch College
John Bishop	1986	Adelaide Festival Centre	
Robert Helpmann	1986	Adelaide Festival Centre	
Matthew Flinders	1986	Flinders University	unveiled by the Duke of Edinburgh
W. A. N. Wells	1987	Lands Titles Office, Adelaide	
Elizabeth II	1987	Parliament House, Canberra	duplicate at Windsor Castle, London
AIF Malaya memorial	1988	Australian War Memorial, Canberra	
John Bray	1990	State Library of SA	
Alexander Cameron	1997	Penola, South Australia	
Skater	1997	Burnside Town Hall, Tusmore	
John Rymill	1998	Coonawarra, SA	duplicate at Rymill winery
John Riddoch	1998	Rymill winery, Coonawarra	

== Gallery ==
=== By John Dowie ===
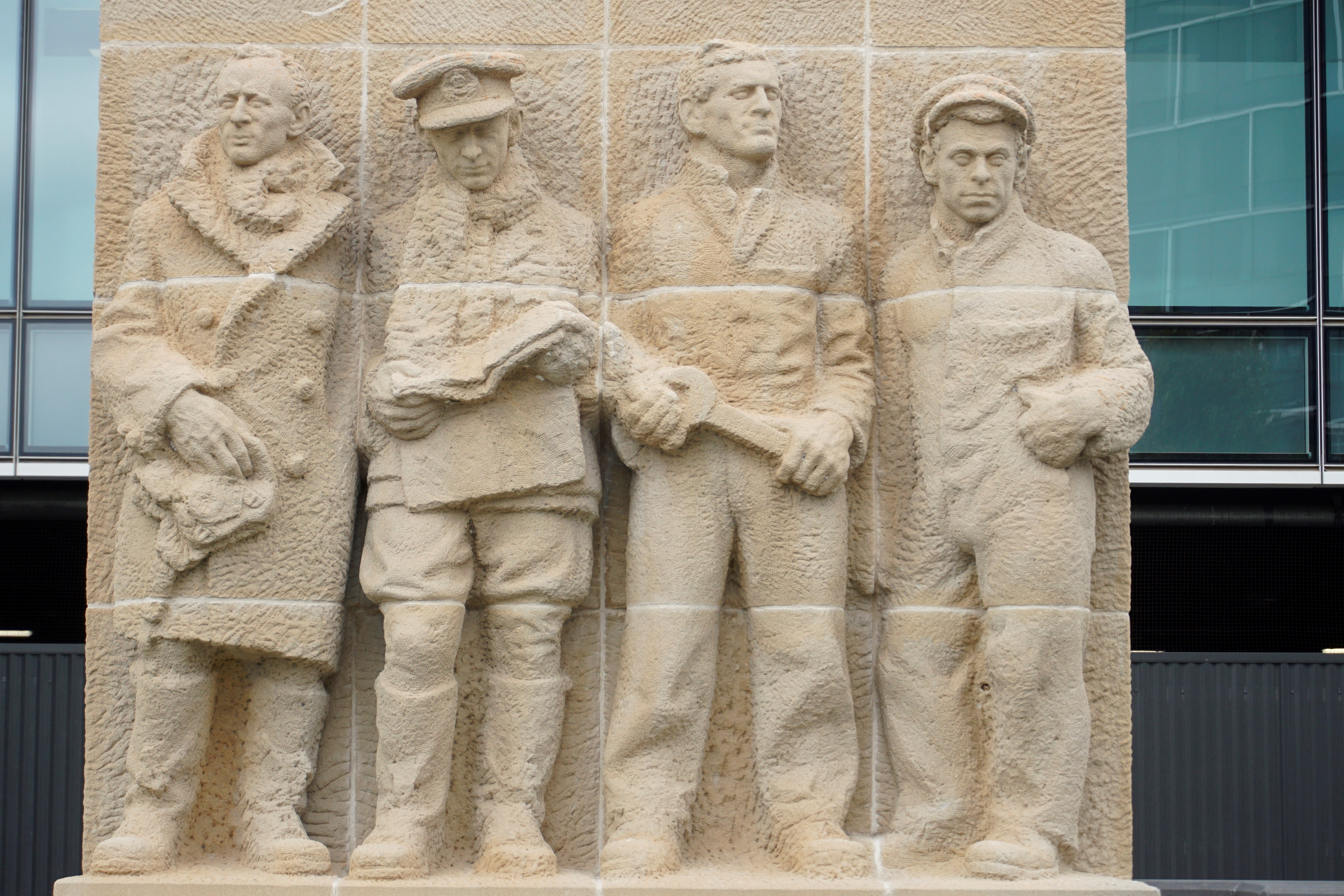
Ross and Keith Smith memorial

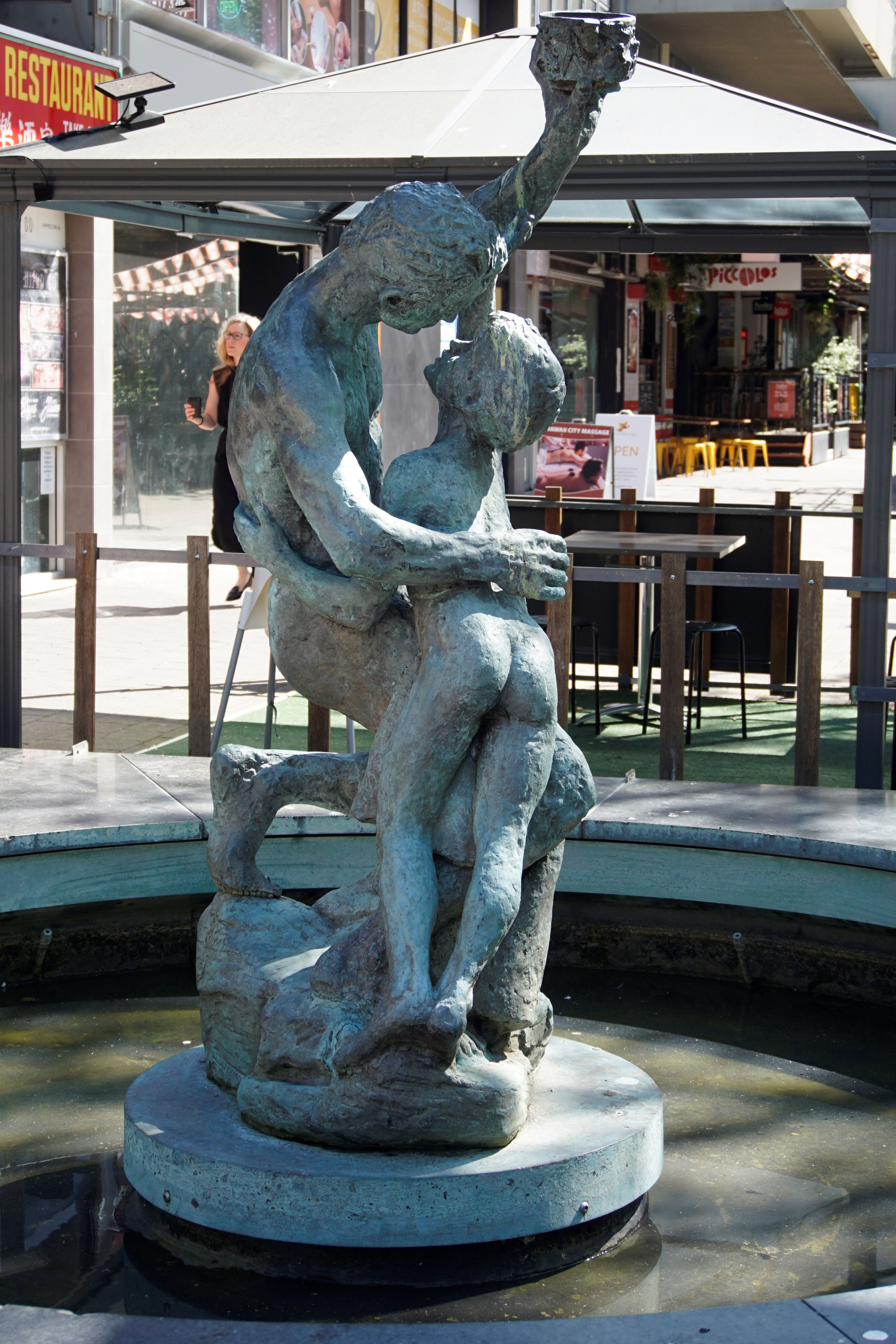
Father and Son, tribute to Sir John Downer

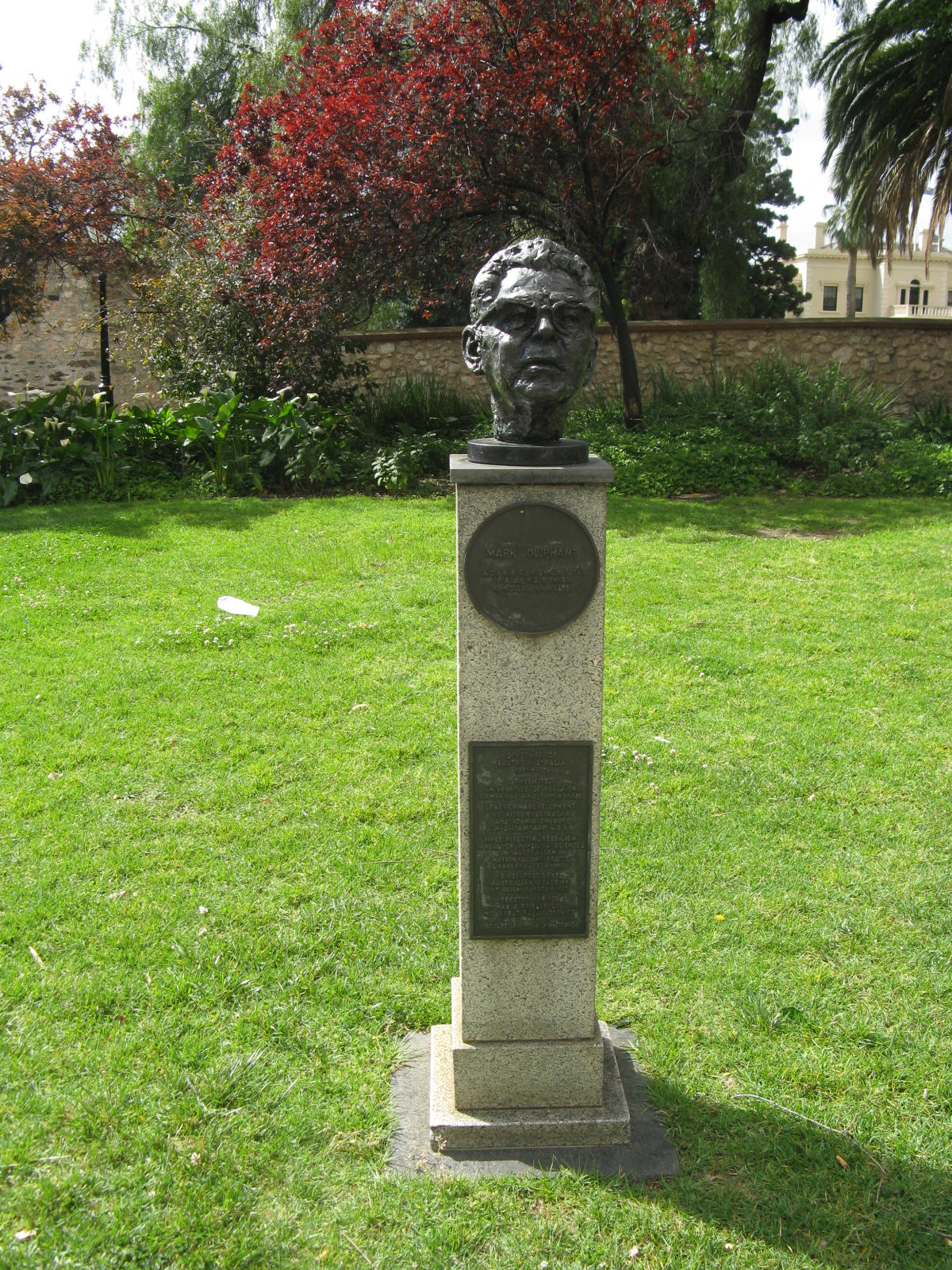
Mark Oliphant

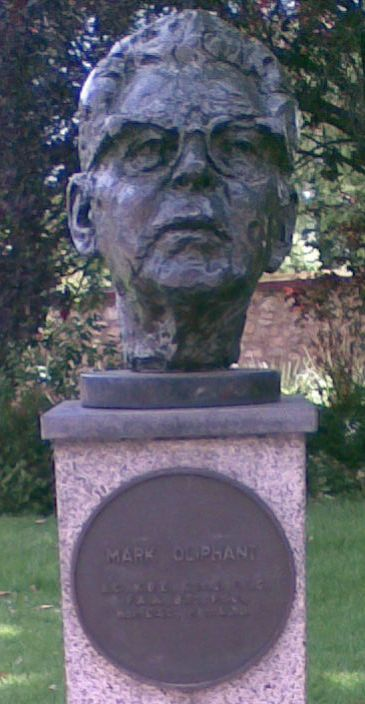
Oliphant

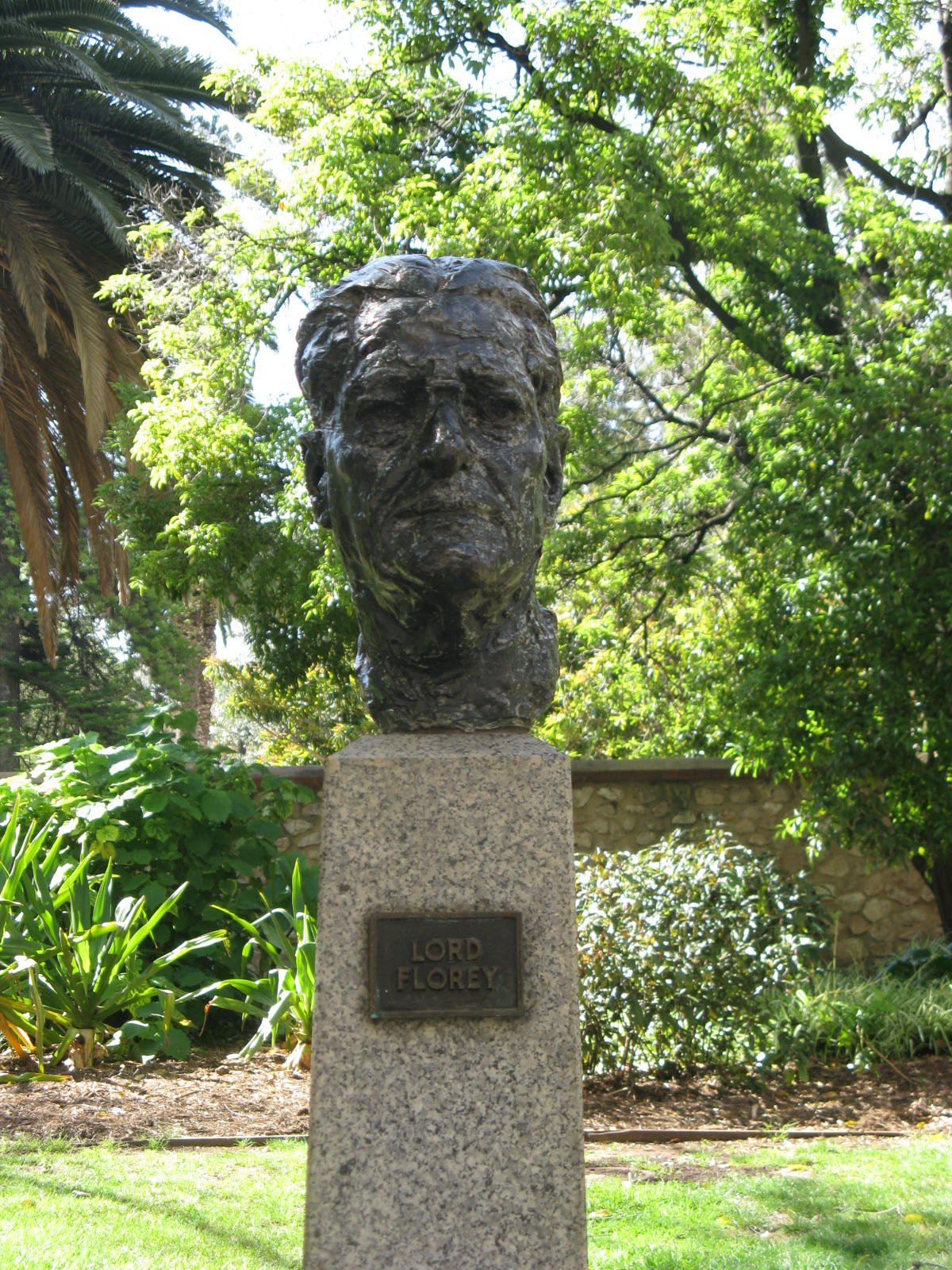
Howard Florey

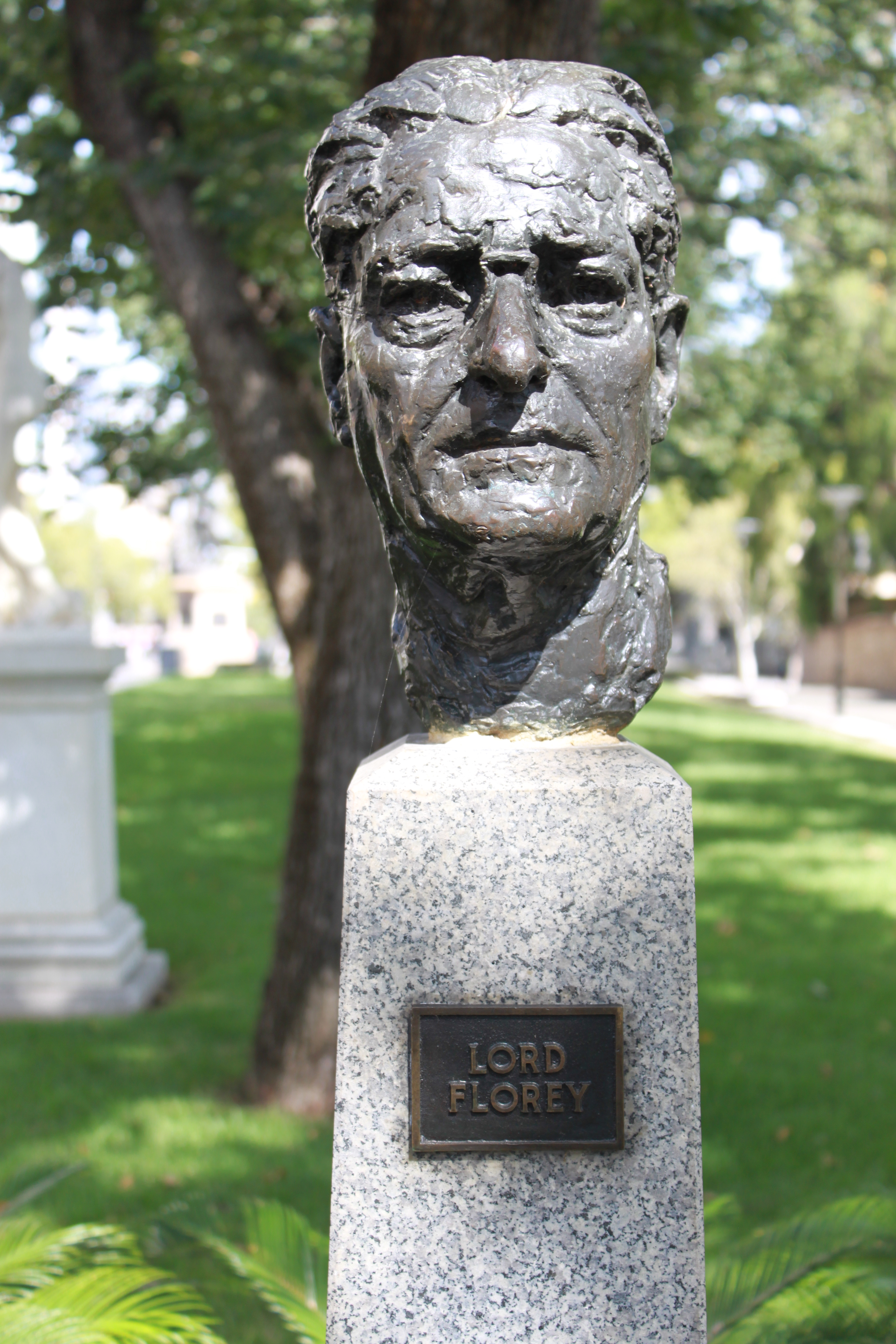
Florey

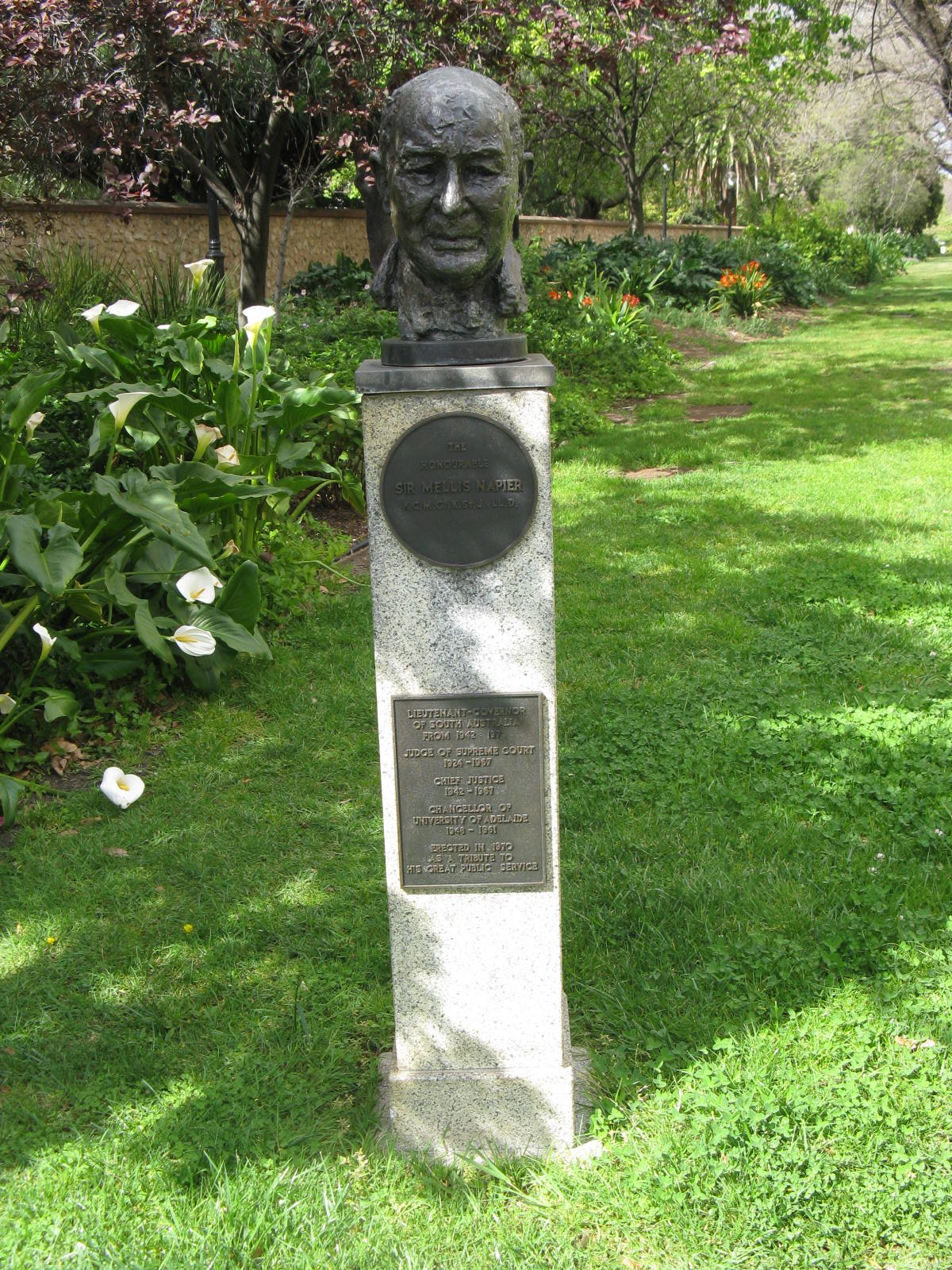
Mellis Napier

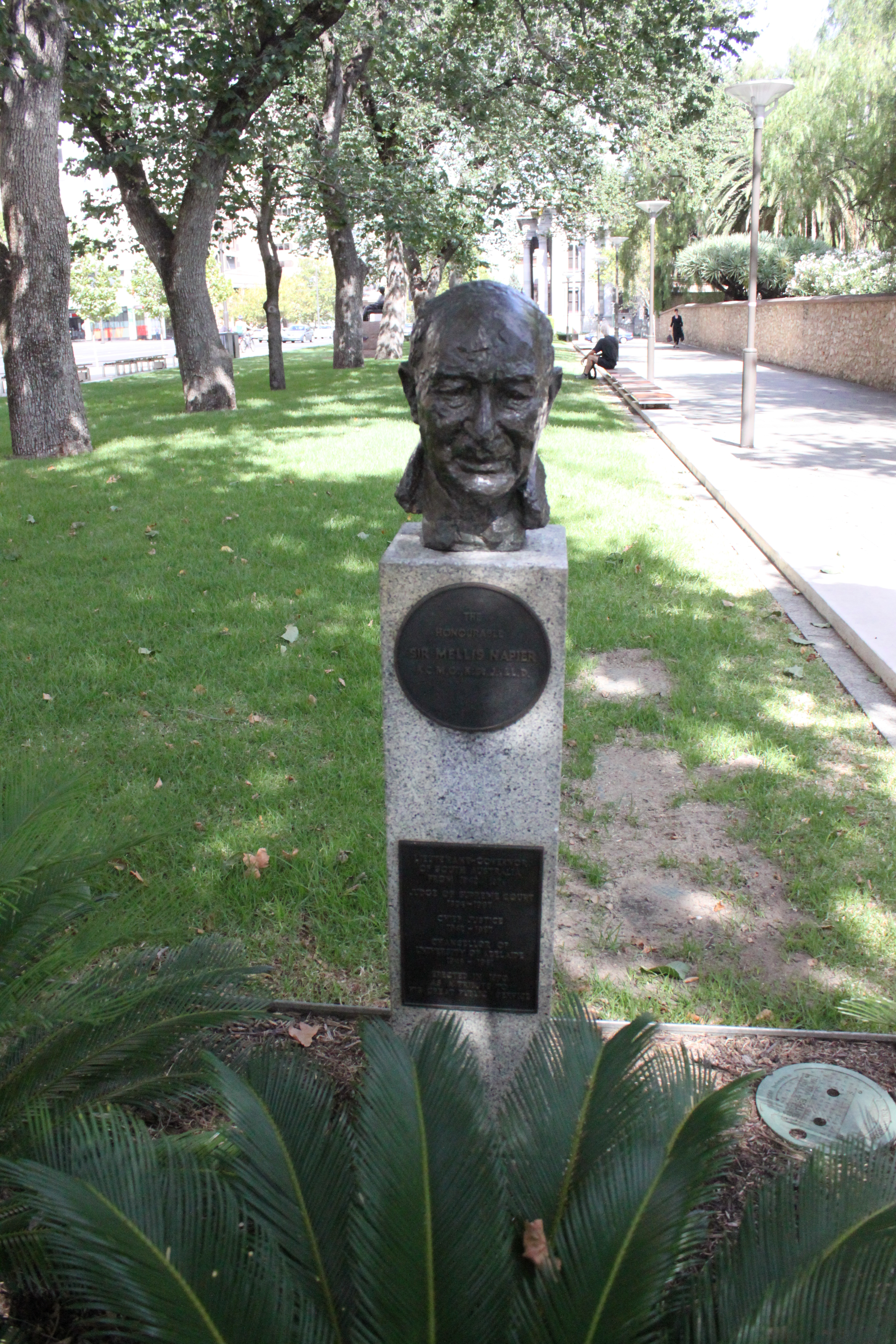
Napier

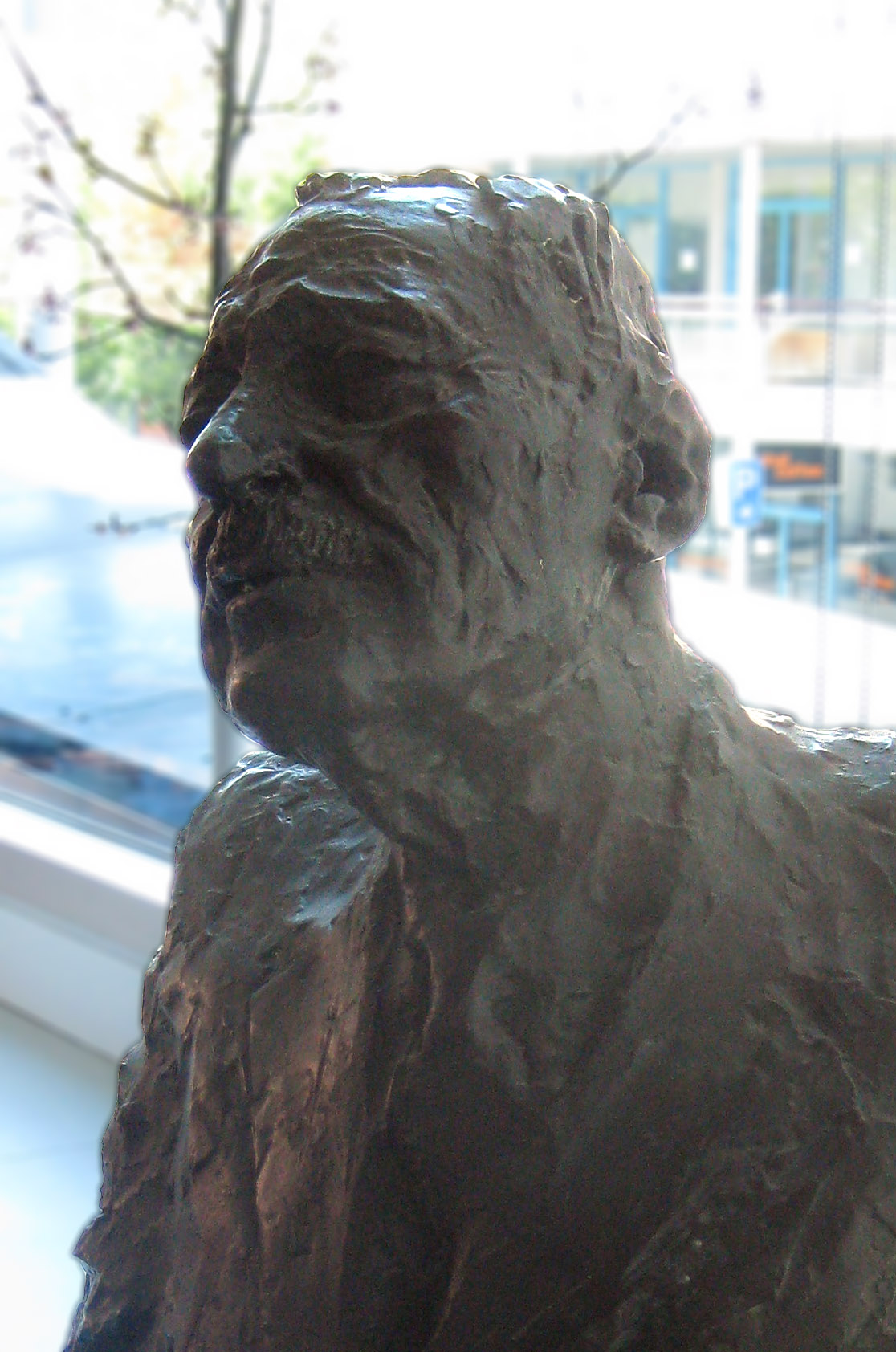
Louis Laybourne Smith

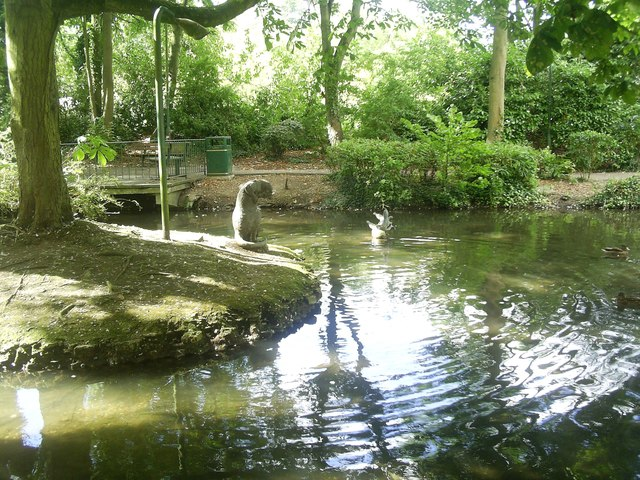
Kangaroo and Platypus, The Water Gardens, Hemel Hempstead, UK

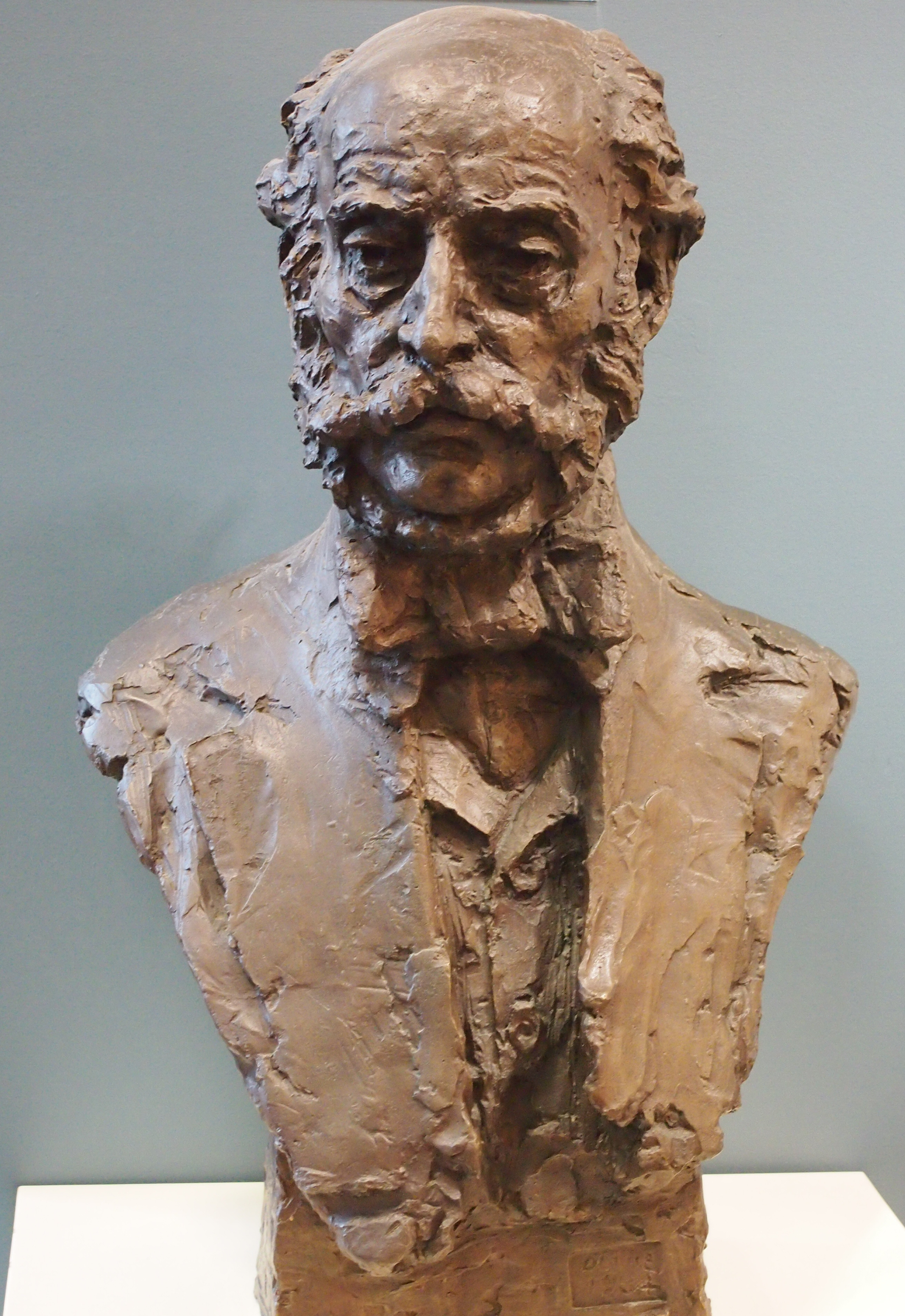
Robert Torrens

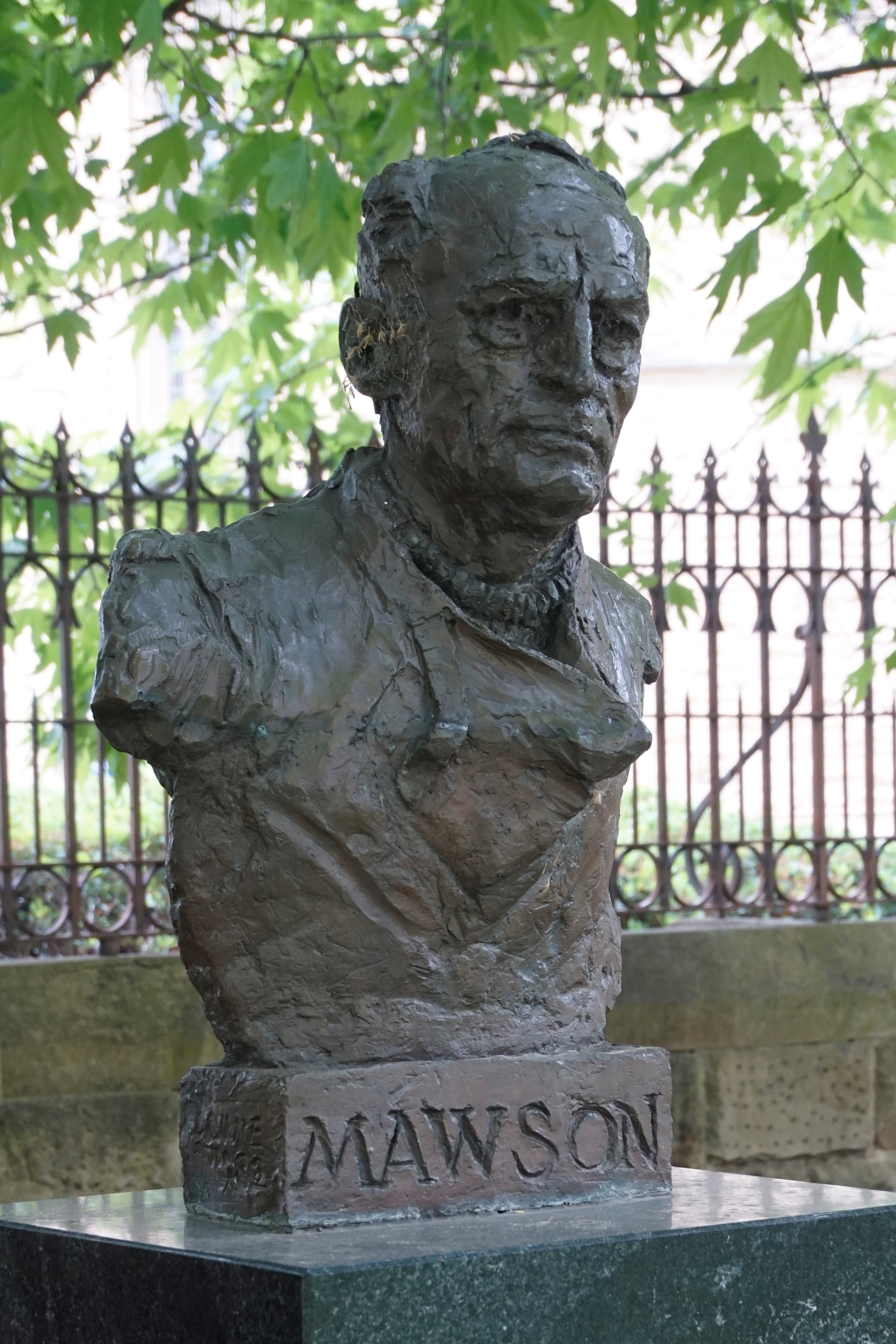
Douglas Mawson

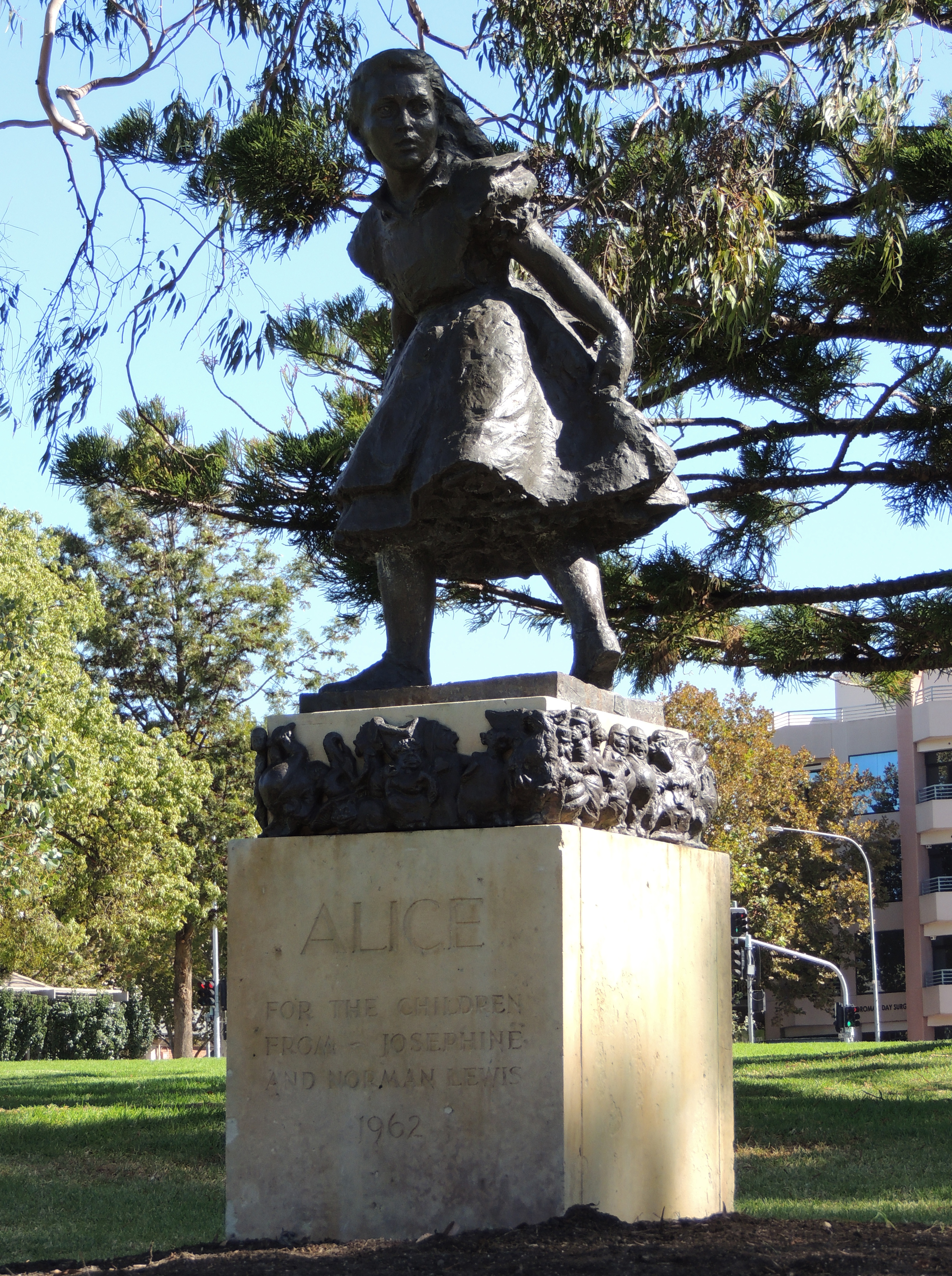
Alice (in Wonderland)

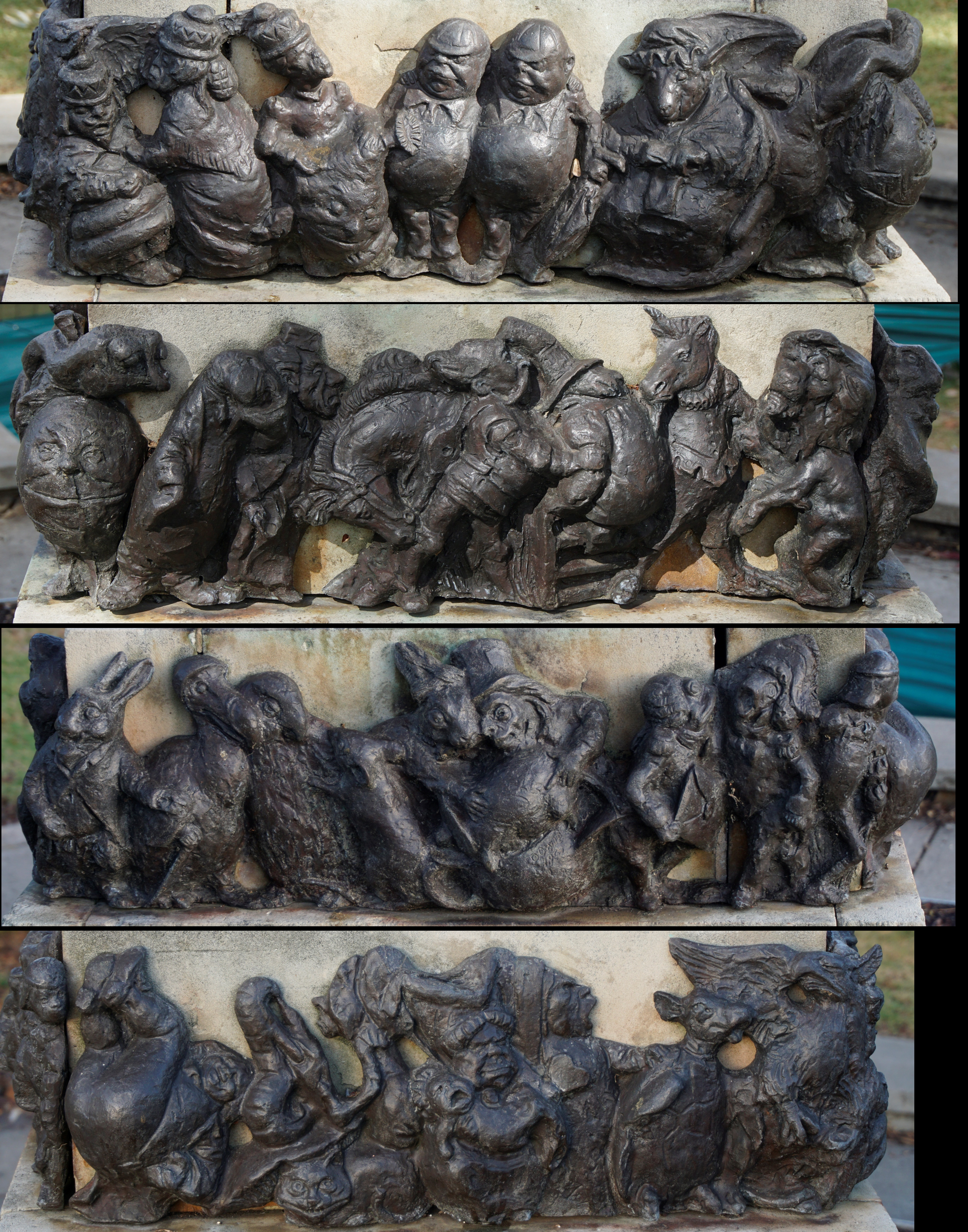
Characters at base of Alice statue

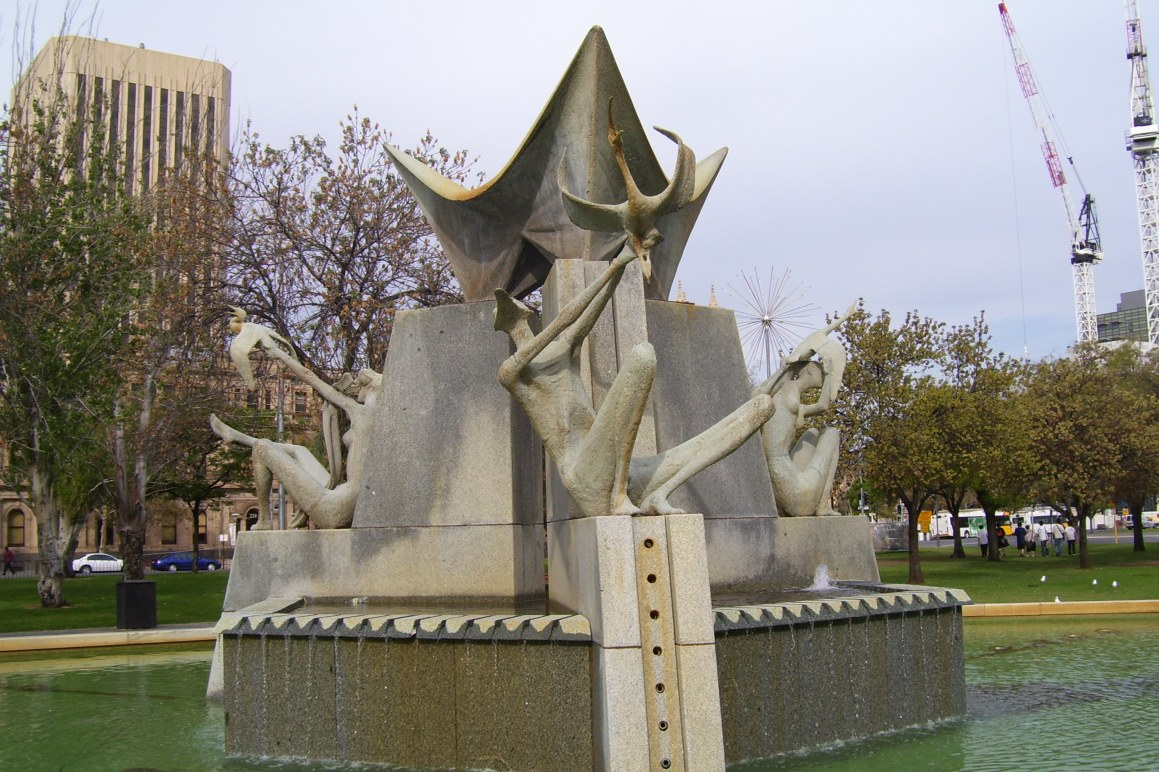
Three Rivers Fountain in Victoria Square, Adelaide

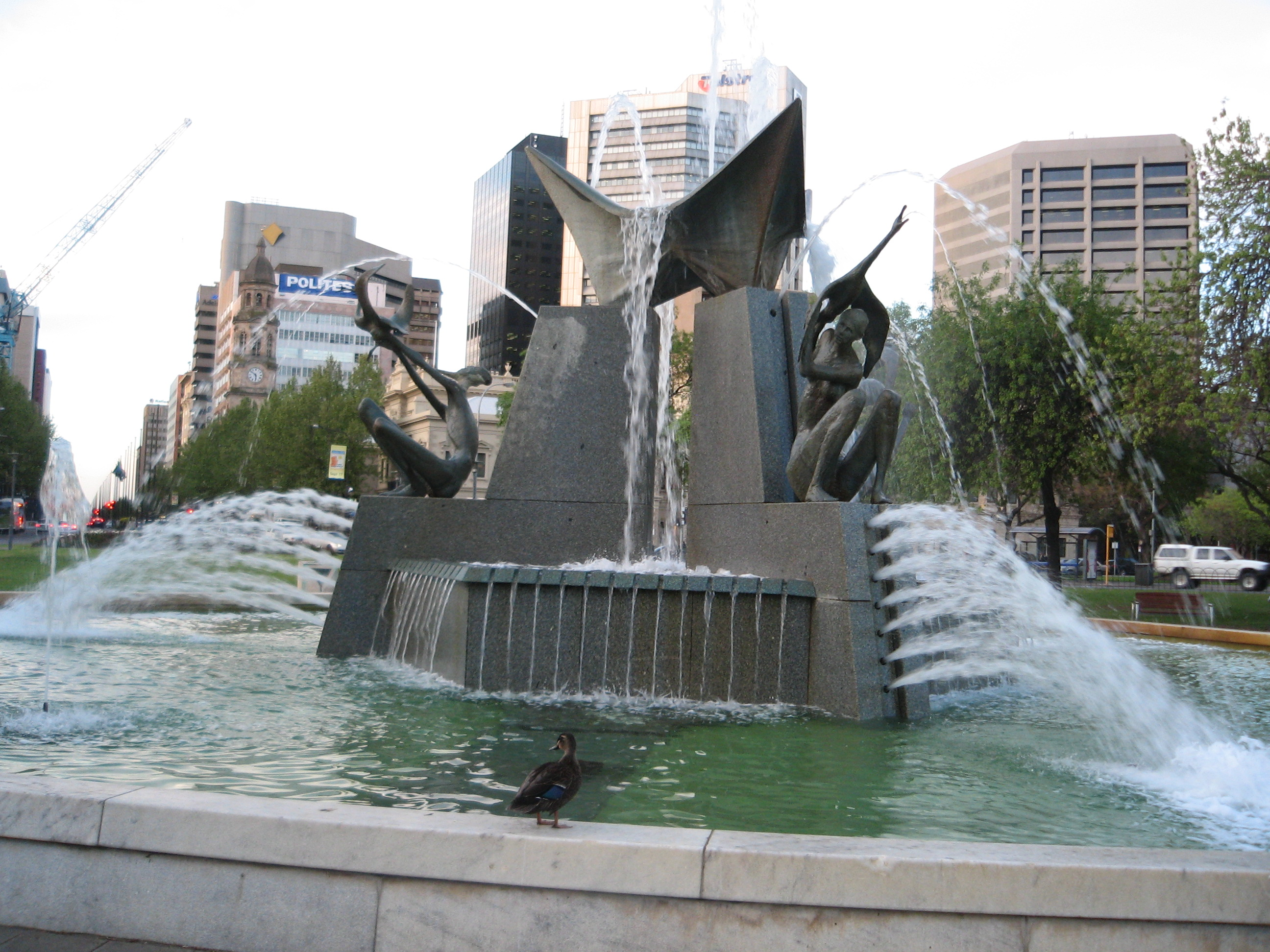
Three Rivers fountain

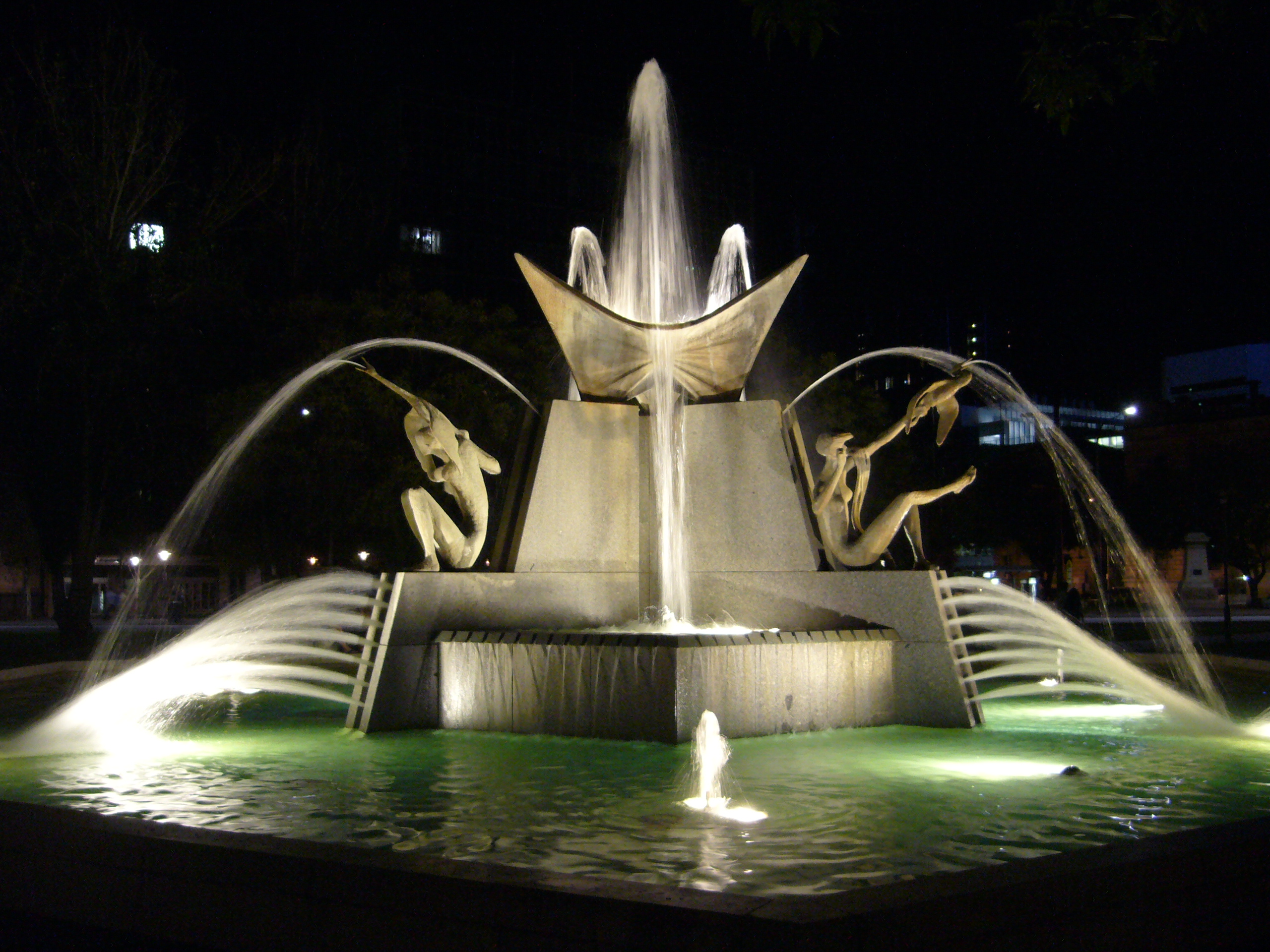
Three Rivers fountain

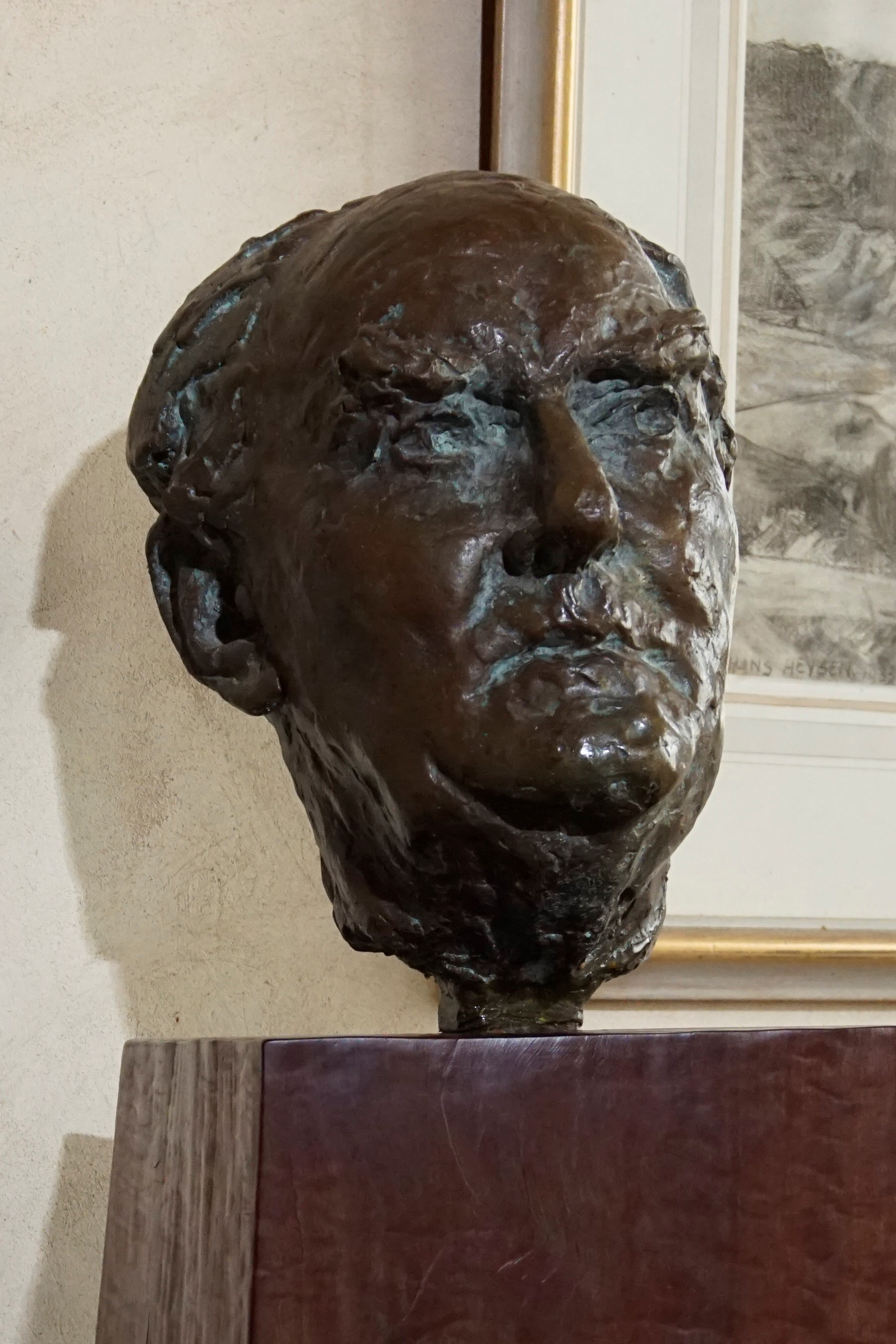
Hans Heysen aged 89

=== About John Dowie ===
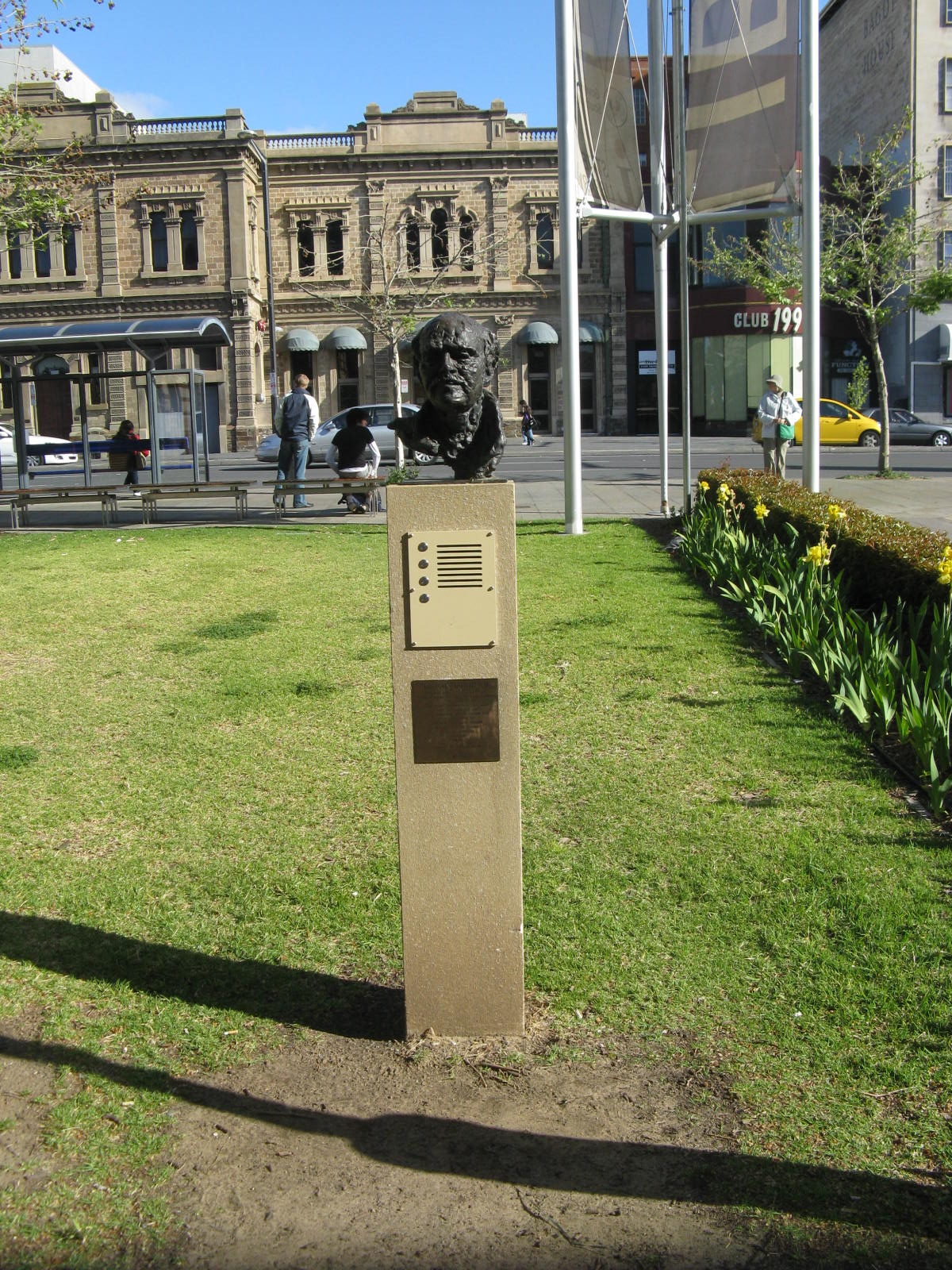
Dowie by John Woffinden, 2006

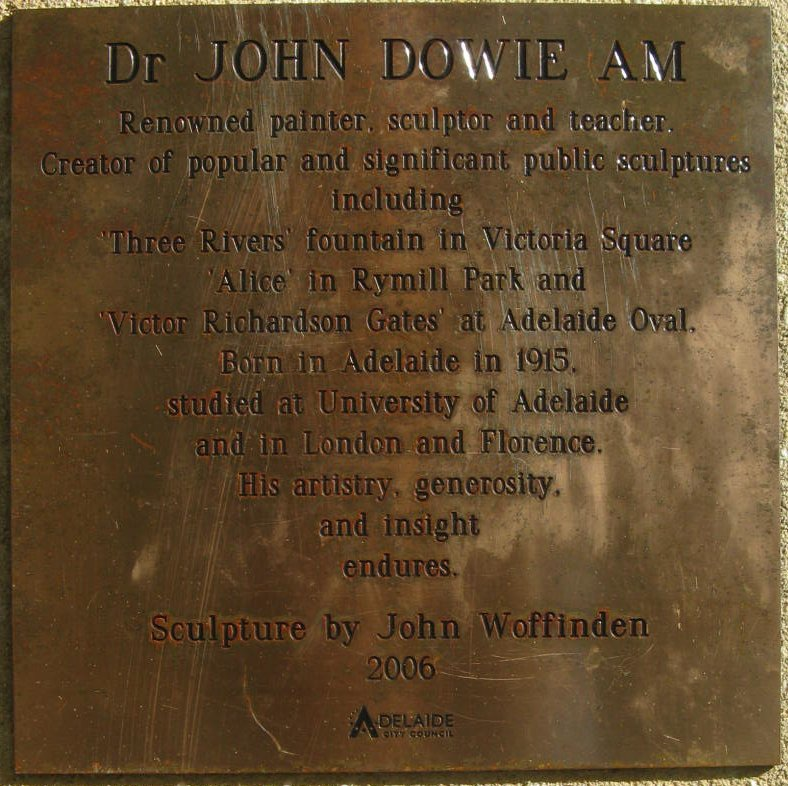
Plaque for Woffinden head

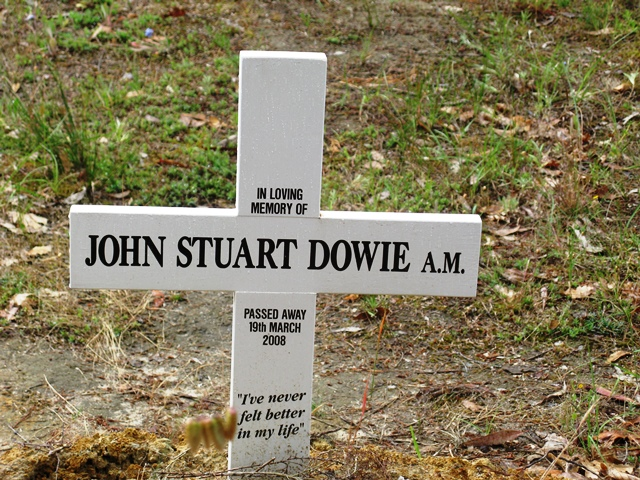
Original grave marker

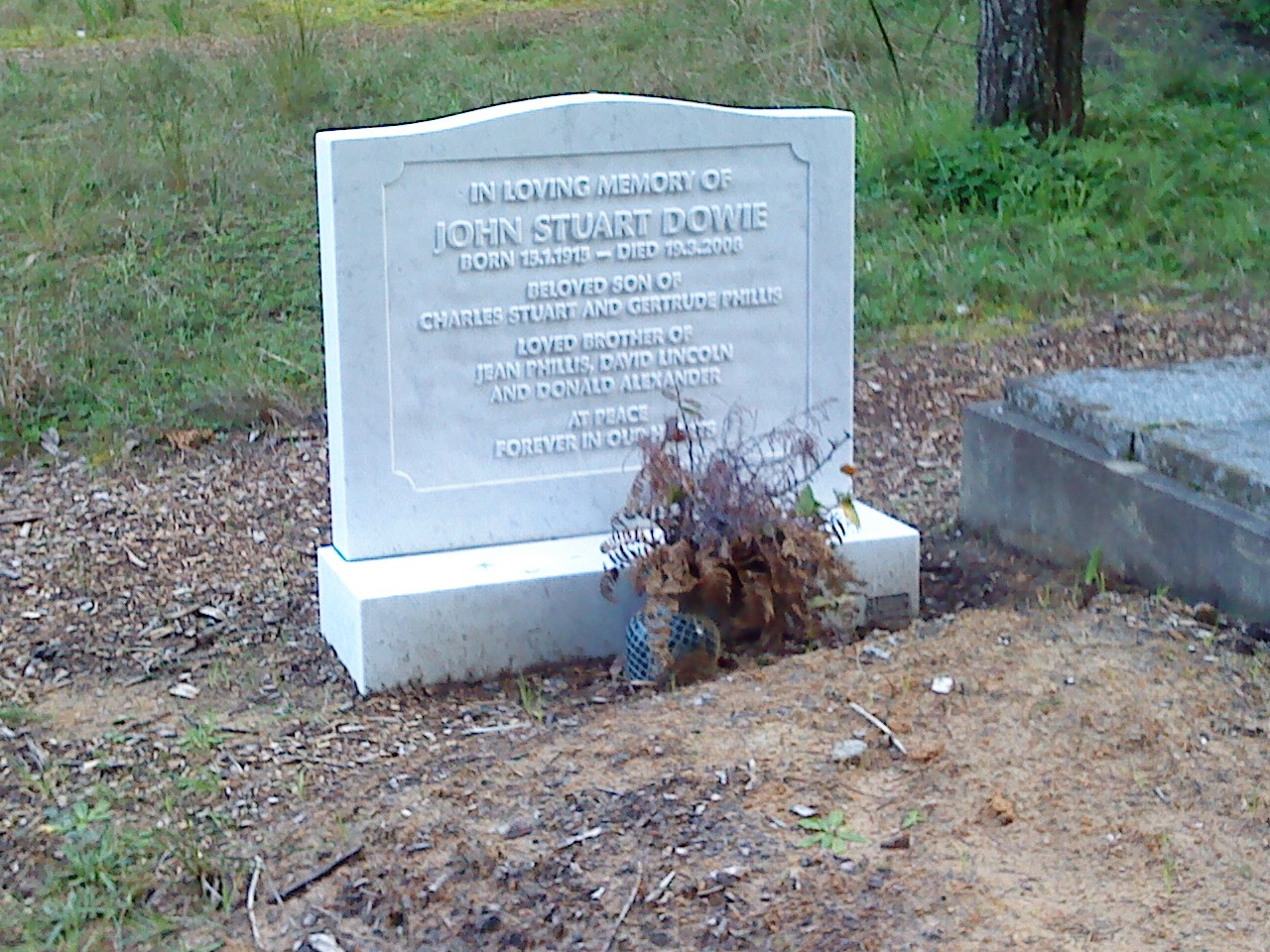
Later headstone
