= John Woffinden =

South Australian sculptor

John Albert Woffinden (born 7 April 1952) is a South Australian sculptor and bronze art founder.

== History ==
John Woffinden was born in Melbourne, son of Roy Woffinden and Marie Woffinden, née Waldron.

He studied sculpture 1981–1983 at Victoria College, Melbourne, where he received his Bachelor of Arts and worked 1982–1983 at the Meridian Sculpture Foundry, (Note: Not to be confused with the foundry of the same name in Peckham Rye, London, the Fitzroy workshops were established in 1973 by Peter Morley, who trained in England.) Fitzroy, Melbourne.

In 1990 he left for Europe and further studies, working in several art foundries.

On his return to Australia he settled in the Adelaide Hills, and in 1992 set up his own foundry at Aldgate Valley Road, Mylor.

He became a protégé and friend of John Dowie and created the bust of Dowie erected by the Adelaide City Council outside the Public Library in 2006.

Among the larger works John cast, is the Donald Bradman bronze at the Adelaide Oval, the original sculpture of Bradman made by Robert ( Alfie) Hannaford, and the Alexander Cameron bronze at Penola, South Australia. He was a major contributor to the 1999 Dame Roma Mitchell bronze on North Terrace. He created the five-piece assemblage Riders in the chariot, a portrait of Patrick White (Himelfarb, Duffield, Parker, Voss) at the Art Gallery of New South Wales. It was a finalist for the 2002 Wynne Prize.

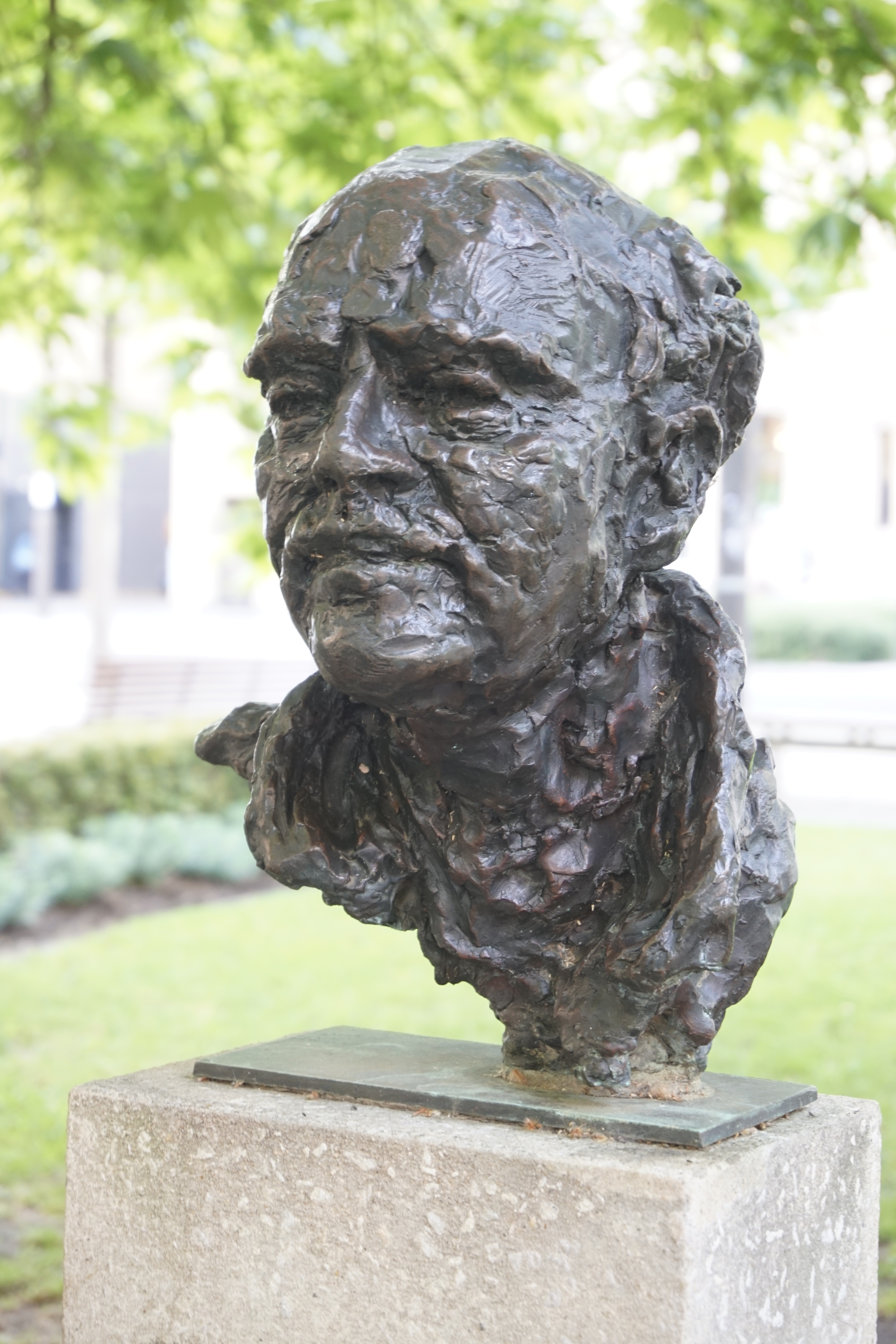
John Dowie

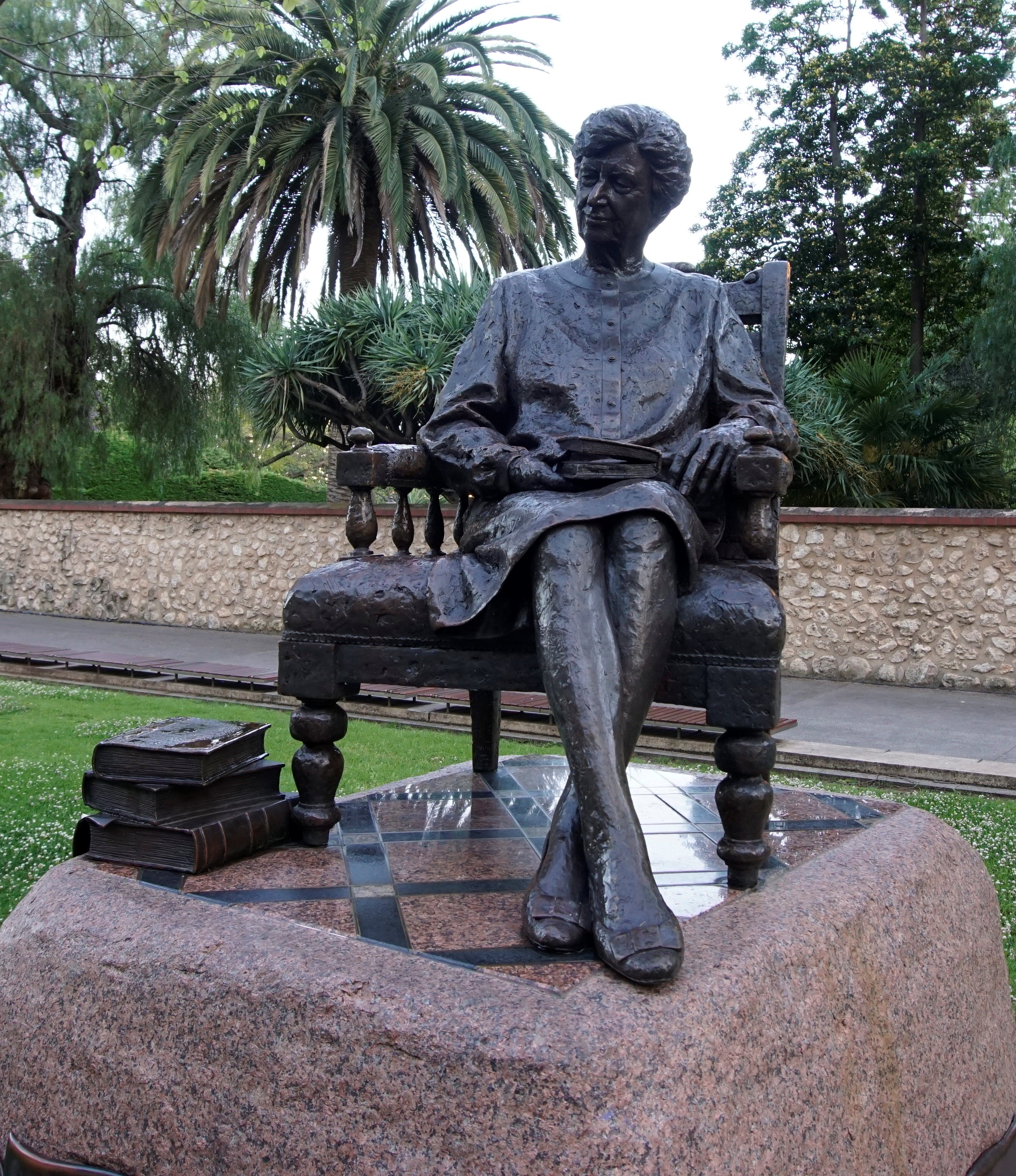
Dame Roma Mitchell

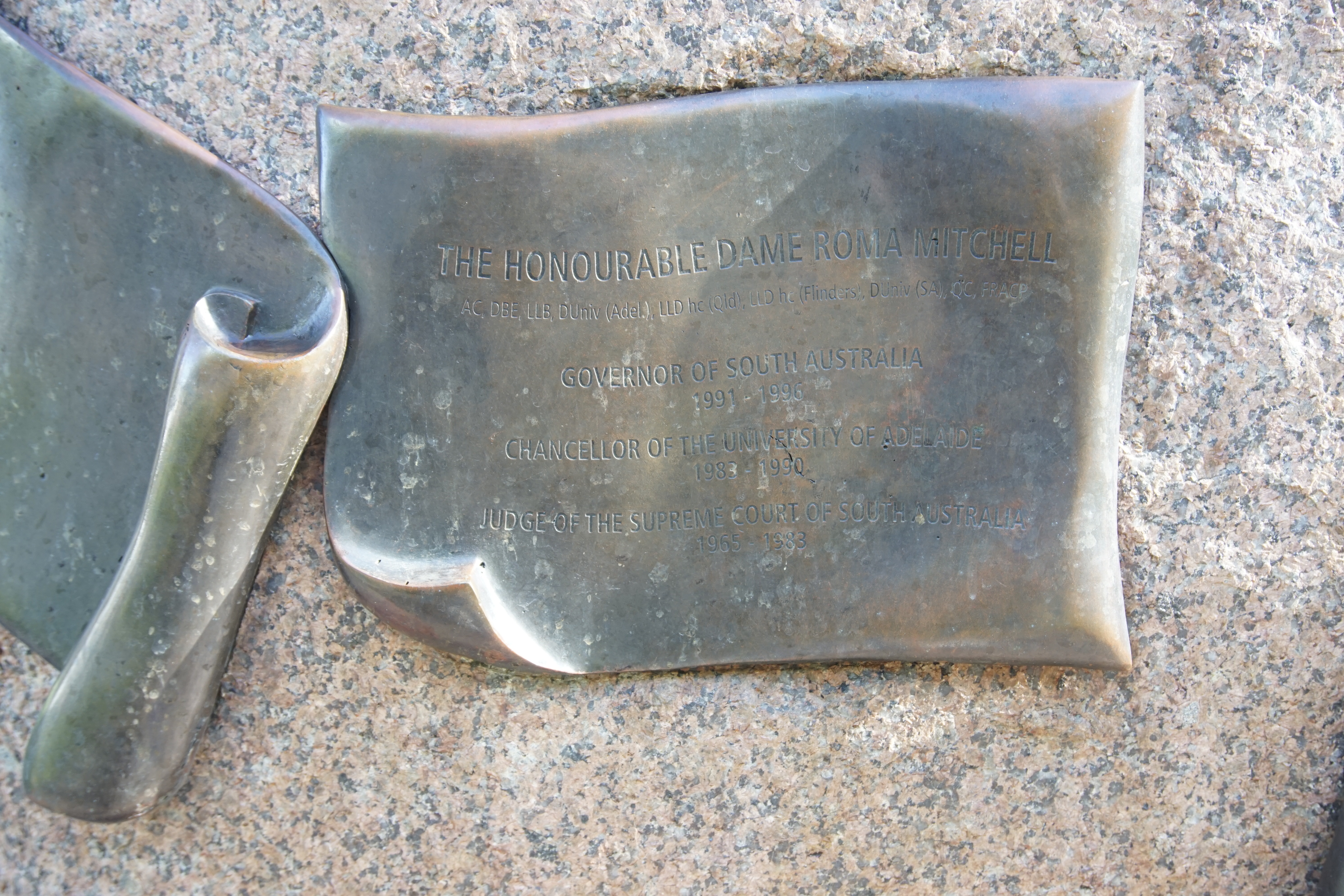
Title plaque

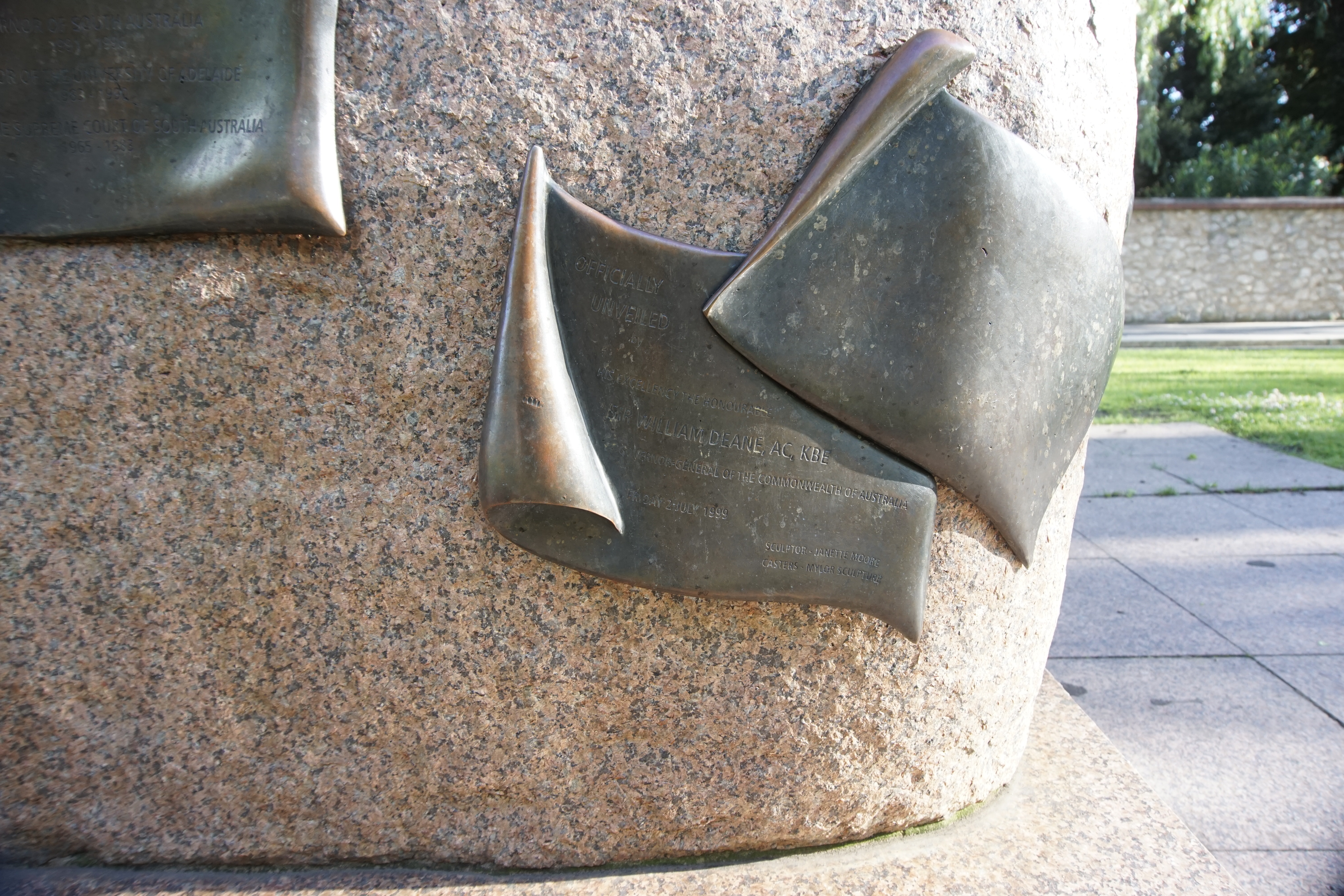
Provenance
