= John Scott (English judge) =

English judge

Sir John Scott
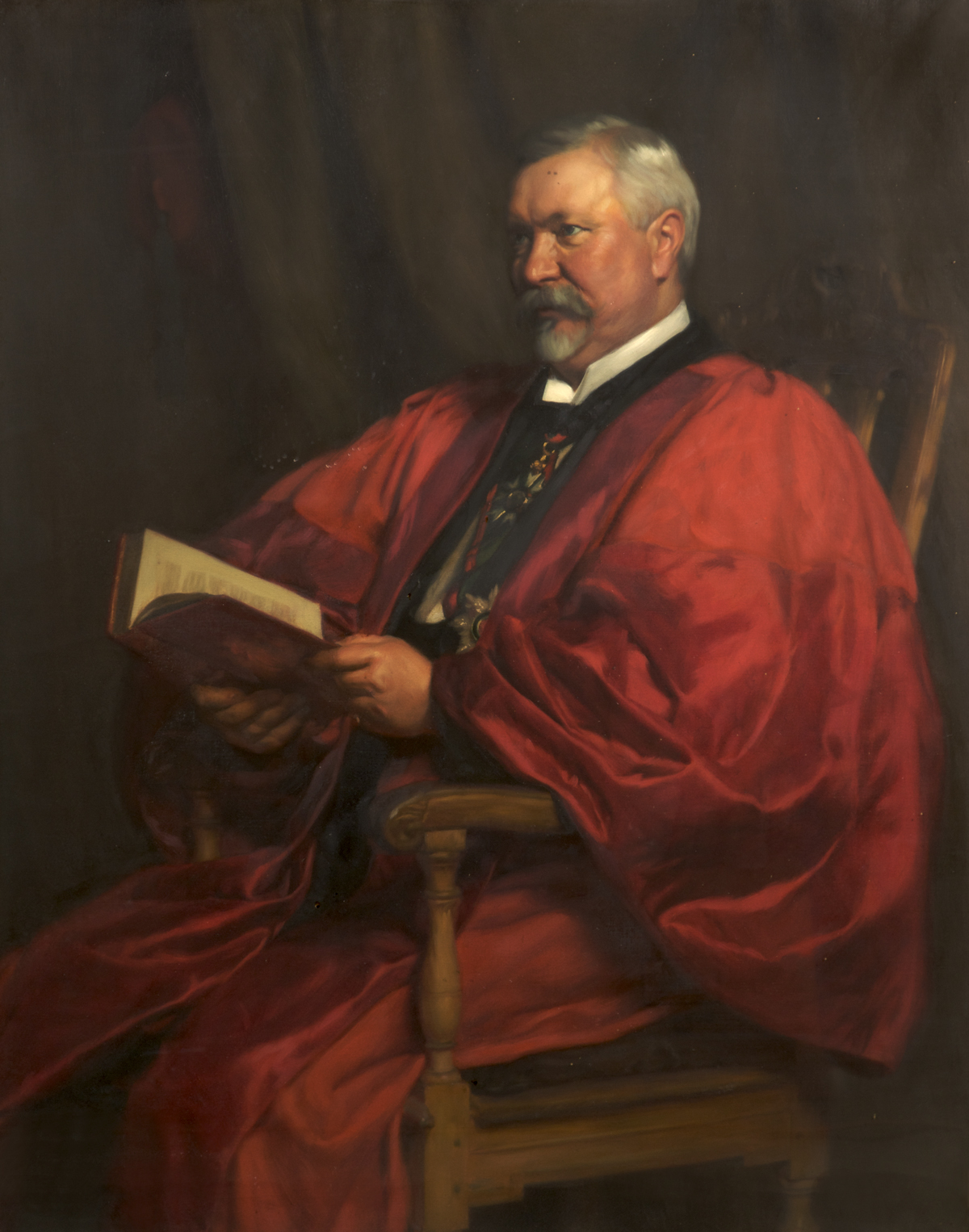
- Sir John Scott painted by John Henry Lorimer
- Born: Standishgate, Wigan, Lancashire
- Died: 1 March 1904 (aged 62); Ramleh, College Road, Norwood, Middlesex
- Education: Bruce Castle School, Tottenham; Pembroke College, Oxford
- Occupations: barrister and judge
- Known for: Vice-President of Court of Appeal at Alexandria, Egypt Judge of the High Court, Bombay; Deputy Judge Advocate-General of HM Forces; Judicial Advisor to The Khedive of Egypt legal and political reformer

Sir John Scott KCMG, DCL (4 June 1841 – 1 March 1904) was an English judge who became Deputy Judge Advocate-General and later Judicial Advisor to the Khedive in his adopted home, Egypt. He was also known as a cricketer in his youth, active from 1861 to 1863 when he played for Oxford University. Scott was renowned for wit, humour and humanity. His position in the annals of imperial legal jurisprudence contributed to the successful legal defence of British Egypt during two world wars. A sure touch, and a deft hand, he articulated a source of justice residing in the everlasting verities of English common law.

== Early life ==
Scott was born in Standishgate Wigan to Edward Scott, a solicitor, and his first wife Annie Glover. After the death of his wife, Edward Scott married Laura Hill, the daughter of the headmaster of Bruce Castle School, Arthur Hill. They had a further two sons and two daughters, including Nora Lilian Alcock.

From 1852 to 1860 Scott was educated at his stepmother's family concern, the Bruce Castle School in Tottenham. The school founded by Laura's grandfather Thomas Wright Hill instructed their students in science and the arts in such a manner to give a student the ability to continue self-education throughout life. His sons, who all taught there at some point, went on to reform some aspect of Victorian life, from prisons (Matthew and Fredric), the postal service (Rowland, devisor of the penny post and penny black stamp) to envelopes (Edwin, invented a machine to fold envelopes). Her father Arthur was headmaster during Scott's time at Bruce Castle and her brother George Birkbeck Hill became his lifelong friend.

Matriculating at Pembroke College, Oxford, Scott graduated with a Bachelor of Arts degree in 1864 and became a Master of Arts in 1869. It was during this time his talent as a cricketer brought him recognition. He appeared in four first-class matches as a left-handed fast bowler. His batting hand is unknown. He scored four runs with a highest score of 2 and took 11 wickets with a best performance of five in one innings.

== Egypt ==
Called to the bar by the Inner Temple on 17 November 1865, he joined the northern circuit. He wrote on legal questions for "The Times", the "Law Quarterly" and other periodicals and his "Bills of Exchange" (1869) became a widely read textbook. A heart condition hampered him through life. Scott went to the French Riviera for a few months in 1871-72 for his health. While there he mastered French, Italian and the French legal system. At the end of 1872 he moved to Alexandria on medical advice to resume his profession. As Egypt's legal system ran on similar lines to the French and Italian jurisprudence the knowledge he had acquired in France proved invaluable. He established a flourishing practice at the British Consular Court. In 1874, on the recommendation of General Sir Edward Staunton, the British Agent and Consular General in Egypt, Scott became the British judge for the new International Courts of Appeal based in Egypt, becoming vice-president in 1881. During his time here Scott regularly contributed to The Times during the Alexandria riots of June 1882; he remained at the court house to assist the protection of the records, ensuring criminals were not let off scot-free from the contempt of destroyed evidence. In the following October the Khedive, Ismail Pasha, conferred the Order of the Osmanie (worn in the painting above) only awarded to civil servants and military leaders for outstanding services to the state. Scott took an interest in the conditions of the agricultural farmers and labourers known as the fellaheen, using his considerable influence to suppress slavery and mistreatment.

== India ==
The end of 1882 Scott was appointed puisne judge of the high court of Bombay. Again he quickly mastered the customs and usages of Indian law whilst simultaneously continuing to write for local and London press, frequently taking note of Egyptian affairs. The diary of his wife published as "An Indian Journal" edited by their grandson, John Radford, covers a varied and interesting life in India, from trials to the elephants at Kandalla.

One trial she mentioned was about a pair of brothers, in her entry for 30 March 1884. "In this week’s Spectator there is a paragraph on a judgement John gave a few days ago. It was a curious case in which some brothers, who had been outcast, agreed to pay a large sum of money in order to be readmitted into their caste and be allowed to marry girls of the caste. The man who managed the whole thing brought an action for a part of the money that he said had not been paid. Certain sums were to be paid to the fathers of the brides through this man, and John ruled that he could not recover such money, as it was in the nature of a purchase of a wife, or wife brokerage, which is totally against English law; and John summed up by saying that although in the low castes the custom of paying for a wife did exist, there was not anywhere, even in Hindu law, any authority for the proceeding, and that it would be wrong "to give marriage brokers a legal status, such as would enable them to enforce their contracts by law." "I think it is immoral and against public policy," he said, "even in the present state of matrimonial relations in India. The tendency of such a decision would be to degrade still further the position of women, and to perpetuate the inequality of their relations with the other sex. In my opinion the contract is void under Section 23 of the Contract Act." The Indian Spectator approves of the decision, and thinks that it will do much good when the marriage brokers, or dalals, find that they have no legal claim for their money."

== Return to Egypt ==
His reputation in Egypt had not diminished by his eight year absence. In 1874 Scott had been nominated to fill the position of English Commissioner of the Public Debt, but the Khedive did not want to deprive the court of appeal of his services. Major Baring, later Lord Cromer, who took the position, requested a loan of Scott’s services from the Indian Government in order that he might examine the whole system of Egyptian jurisprudence and make proposals for its amendment. Lord Cromer had further plans for Scott. He induced the Khedive to not only accept his recommendations but to also appoint Scott as his judicial adviser. The Egyptian Premier, Riaz Pasha, took exception to his appointment creating a tremendous hullabaloo, instructing the French Consular General against this intolerable extension of British power. Scott’s proposals and reputation spoke for themselves and he took the position in 1891, Pasha resigned in the May of that year on the grounds of ill health. It was later acknowledged that Scott’s appointment "has resulted in one of the greatest strides yet made by Egypt in the direction of ultimate self- government". At that time foreigners still enjoyed extraterritorial rights and were only amenable to their own consulate and laws in criminal matters. This privilege had been granted in medieval times to induce foreigners to settle in the Ottoman dominions. His chief aim was to ensure that eventually they could say "We can now give you justice in our own courts; we ask that all who dwell in our country shall be amenable to the ordinary municipal tribunals and law." During his year on loan he visited tribunals, assisting at the hearings, talking to the judges, examining their records and generally studying the actual system in its working all over the country from Assouan to Alexandria. By decreasing the number of judges per trial, increasing the number of courts in Upper Egypt, improving the law school, increasing the number of qualified Egyptian lawyers, reducing the cost of court fees and creating law reports to allow peer review of well-considered judgements and carelessness. He wanted reform not revolution.

=== The Judiciary ===
The report found that the judiciary were not all fit for the jobs they held. There were excellent magistrates, but many had been named arbitrarily by the government, some by favour and some because they were unfit for the office they previously held. One man who had been the doorkeeper of a previous Prime Minister had suddenly become a Judge of the Court of Appeal. With the assistance of the Ministry of Justice a list was created of the least capable, they were retired with a pension. A strict was imposed rule that a legal diploma was required for future judicial office and a system of gradual promotion established. No judge was retired before a replacement had been found. Although the law school in Cairo had been neglected and had no director a number of young Egyptians had recently graduated from French and Italian universities with law degrees so candidates for the vacant positions were available. As a means to encourage hard work and a disinclination to take bribes the salaries were increased in line with those of the provincial French judiciary.

=== Education ===
Regenerating the Egyptian school of law was essential to Scotts goal. M. Testoud, a French law professor, was appointed as director of the school and was a great success. Within two years they had a good staff of Egyptian, French and Italian teachers with a hundred students. The period of training was four years, with annual exams, and no student was accepted without first passing the secondary examination in the Government schools, so they were sufficiently grounded in general knowledge. As President of the Board of Examiners Scott considered that it was more from the desire of a Government job than love of the law that drove the students to work hard at their studies.

=== The One Judge System ===
As the Egyptian courts had been based on the French system cases were sat by either three or five judges. After observing the courts he saw that in practice one judge did the majority of the work but their individual actions were saved from criticism by the presence of his colleagues. His view was that one judge per case would increase the capacity of the court and improve the quality of the work when the judge took sole responsibility for ruling. At first the proposition met with great opposition as it was considered too English. Fortunately Scott discovered Algeria had adopted the same system so eventually the Council of Ministers decided in Scott's favour. Two Bills passed into law: The first enabled a single judge to decide in first instance on civil disputes of claims not exceeding £100 and all criminal cases where the maximum punishment did not exceed two years. The second established local courts of appeal of three judges, who heard, in final instance all appeals from a single judge. Thus the Central Court of Appeal was left free for due consideration of the most important cases. This allowed the country's seven tribunals to be gradually be increased to forty-five one-judge tribunals all over the country. Those who were unable to travel great distances to recover small debts could now go to a local town where an officer of the court would draw their claim on their behalf which was then served at once. The case would be heard on a fixed day, the decision also on that day and the decision executed. If it did go to appeal claimant would not have to travel to Cairo but instead to the local provincial capital. Reducing the court fees increased the number of people seeking civil claims. The Treasury were at first not in favour as they considered it would decrease their revenue. The reduced fee increased the number of cases from 16,800 in 1891 to 69,400 in 1898; 68,445 of these were decided by a single judge. Case volumes rose as revenues increased from £78,000 in 1891 with the high tariff to £115,000 in 1899 with a very low tariff.

=== Judicial Superintendence and review ===
The introduction and expansion of the one-judge system required a system of superintendence due to the novelty and new judges without experience, though no judicial decision was allowed to be revised. The inspectors were from the upper ranks of the judicial body, their reports were given to the Committee of Judicial Control in Egypt who discussed the reports once or twice a week. This method allowed them to examine the work of every tribunal. Faults were communicated to the judge concerned and if it were an important matter a general circular was issued to all tribunals. The necessity for fault-finding did diminish. The new tribunals were also equipped with a law library from the French system; all the judges being capable of reading and speaking both Arabic and French. To this were added the Egyptian law reports compiled monthly so that decisions of the other tribunals throughout the country might be recorded. Scott also took into consideration the work done by his step uncles by reforming the prison system. The prison regime imposed hard labour punishments enabling prisoners to earn an honest livelihood when released. Juvenile offenders were sent to a reformatory, at Scott's insistence, to learn a trade and to read and write.

=== Anecdotes ===
When Scott spoke of his work in Egypt in 1899 he told of the reaction of the Egyptian public was one of surprise, as they "could hardly believe in the impartiality and freedom from corruption of a judge, especially if he sat alone, isolated from his colleagues and free from all control." "I remember three years ago one of the richest and most influential people in Lower Egypt was charged with forgery. He moved heaven and earth to save himself from punishment, and was absolutely astounded – he even sent his lawyer to complain to me – when the court found him guilty and the Court of Appeal confirmed the conviction. In the same year the son of one of the wealthiest proprietors in Egypt had chosen to amuse himself by organising a band of brigands, who attacked outlying villages, and robbed and killed as they used to in the good old fashioned times. He was as much astonished as my friend the forger when he found himself doing a long period of penal servitude. Only last year a prince, cousin of the Khedive, walked into the principal club of Cairo with a loaded revolver and fired upon and wounded another prince of the Vice-Regal family with whom he had a quarrel. He, too, like the forger and the brigand, is now suffering in a convict prison the effect of the new reign of equal law."

=== His efforts Acknowledged ===
The British Government recognised Scott's work with a knighthood in 1894, the same year as General Kitchener. Even publications such as The Spectator gave the reason behind Scott's K.C.M.G more column space than Kitchener's. The people of Wigan were ahead of the Government by awarding him the Freedom of the Borough in 1893. As always the Wigan Observer gave their distinguished townsman several inches in their very small typeface, even though Old Wiganers would probably be pretty well acquainted with the career of, as he was known by the people of Upper Egypt, "Scott the Just". When he retired in 1898, due to ill health, the Khedive awarded Scott the Order of the Medjidie, his college an honorary fellowship and his University a D.C.L. The painting above by J.H.Lorimer, R.S.A was presented by the courts in Egypt and Pembroke College hung a portrait in chalks, depicting the judge clad in Indian robes, by his sister-in-law, Miss E.G.Hill, which hung in the senior common room. He was also elected a member of the Athenaeum under Rule II.

=== Post Egypt ===
Retirement for a man with a motto of "It’s dogged as does it" was never going to last long. By the end of 1898 he was appointed Deputy Judge Advocate-General of the army. This was ordinarily light duties but the war in South Africa made the workload far greater. In declining health he suffered under an increasing burden of work. He died at his residence Ramleh, College Road, Norwood on 1 March 1904 from a complication of heart and liver trouble.

=== Family ===
On 16 February 1867 he married Edgeworth Leonora Hill, who was the cousin of his stepmother Laura and his brother-in-law George Birkbeck Hill. She had been named after the writer Maria Edgeworth, but was known to her family as Nora. She wrote an account of her time in India, exploring the landscape and the customs with her friends the doctors, Miss Dewar and Miss Peachey.

Their children also followed in the family footsteps:

Leslie Frederic, K.C. became a judge on the northern circuit, with a particular interest in mining law. He studied mining at first hand to improve his judgments. Later he became M.P. for the Exchange division of Liverpool in 1910 and eventually senior Lord Justice of Appeal.

Lady Nora Gordon Pim. Her name suggests that the Hill tradition continued and she was named after her family's close friend General Gordon or a distant branch of the family that were also named Gordon. She went on to marry Sir Alan Pim, colonial administrator and co-founder of Oxfam.

Nora Lepard Alcock, M.B.E. (known to her family as Lilian) pioneer in the field of plant pathology and the first government-appointed plant pathologist in Scotland. She was awarded M.B.E for research into fungal diseases, in particular red core disease in strawberries. A member of the Linnean Society, the Royal Botanic Garden Edinburgh still proudly bears a memorial plaque to her.

=== Wigan Museum ===
Following the death of Lady Scott her family presented the Wigan Public Libraries Committee with a small collection of objects of Egyptian antiquity collected by Scott, with a view to the future establishment of a museum in Wigan. The Wigan Examiner reported that "In offering the gift to the "Wigan Museum" Lady Pim writes: " I am very glad that the Wigan Libraries Committee will accept these things, and that I hope that in the course of time a Wigan Museum will take shape. My father would like something of his to be in it for he – and my mother also – was very proud of his connection with Wigan."" The objects are currently (February 2023) on display at the Museum of Wigan Life.

The collection spans 4000 years of Egyptian history and contains one of possibly only five gold coffin masks of its type in the world. The coffin mask has been dated to the iconic 18th dynasty (1570-1293BC) and was most likely owned by a member of the royal family. An item of particular interest from a language perspective is a fragment of approximately 1m in length from the lid of a 25th Dynasty coffin. It has two scenes painted between the hieroglyphs. One shows the weighing of the heart, where the deceased it judged to be worthy of the afterlife. To the ancient Egyptians Ma’at was the concept of truth, law and justice which everyone was judged by after death. It is fitting that Scott had this depiction in his collection. The second scene is an unusual one. At first glance it may too seem typical but on closer inspection the viewer will notice a reed hovering before each figure, seemingly out of context. But for those initiates of ancient Egyptian hieroglyphs this misplaced plant actually gives a voice to the grieving family. In ancient Egyptian language the reed followed by a figure with arm raised spells O! (A lament). The artist's remarkable combination of letters and images gives these mourners a voice forever, for the Egyptian belief that the spoken word endures for all eternity means that this lament will echo for all time.

=== Pendelbury ===
Scott also has another odd connection to Egyptology. The house that he was born in was later bought by the grandfather of archaeologist John Pendlebury when he extended his department store.
