= Rosamond Davenport Hill =

British educational administrator and prison reformer

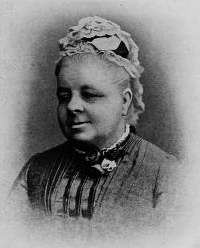
- Rosamond Davenport Hill, 1888
- Born: 4 August 1825; Chelsea, London, England, United Kingdom
- Died: 5 August 1902 (aged 77); Oxford, England, United Kingdom
- Occupations: Reformer, educational administrator

Rosamond Davenport Hill (4 August 1825 – 5 August 1902) was a British educational administrator and prison reformer. She was the best known of three sisters who were the third generation of their family to take an interest in social reform. Her two sisters were Florence Davenport Hill and Joanna Margaret Hill. Rosamond took an interest in prisons, education and in the care of juvenile delinquents.

== Early life and education ==
Rosamond Davenport Hill was born on 4 August 1825 in Chelsea in London. Her parents were Matthew Davenport Hill and Margaret Bucknall. In 1826, the family moved to Chancery Lane then in 1831, they moved to Hampstead Heath. The children were Alfred Hill born in 1821, Florence Davenport Hill who was also born in Chelsea in 1828, Matthew Berkeley Hill and Joanna Margaret Hill who was born in Hampstead in 1836/7.

Rosamond's immediate family were all reforming individuals but her extended family on her father's side included the stamp inventor Rowland Hill, the prison inspector Frederic Hill and Francis Hill.

As a young girl, Davenport Hill was fond of botany, which she studied at a day school. She received a lot of her education at home, which was taught by her mother, who suffered from health problems and relied on Davenport Hill to help maintain the home. Davenport Hill was a very proactive child regarding her own education. As part of her schooling, she and her sister Florence interviewed the Irish writer Maria Edgeworth on 1 March 1840. That year, the family moved to Haverstock Hill. Upon their move, they became friendly with William Makepeace Thackeray.

== Teaching career and prison reform interests ==
In 1841, the family moved to France, followed by Belgium in 1844, and eventually Switzerland and Italy. The family moved back to England, settling in Bristol, in 1851 due to Matthew Davenport Hill becoming a bankruptcy commissioner. Davenport Hill began working for Mary Carpenter. She worked at Carpenter's St. James ragged school and taught the children arithmetic and home economics. She also worked for her father, who had become active in educational and criminal law reform. She visited Ireland in 1856, where she visited prisons with her father. She wrote a book about her experience titled "A Lady's Visit to the Irish Convict Prisons". In 1858, the two went to Spain, France, and Germany to visit prisons. Davenport Hill focused exclusively about prison reform until the mid-1870s. She co-authored a book with her father, in 1860, titled "Our Exemplars, Rich and Poor."

In 1855, Davenport Hill visited Mettray Penal Colony with her father. They became close friends with Mettray's founder, Frédéric-Auguste Demetz. Mettray suffered considerable damage during the Franco-Prussian War. Davenport Hill raised £2,500 to fund renovations for Mettray. Inspired by the work there, Davenport Hill, and her sister, opened an industrial school for girls based on Mettray, in Bristol. Her father died in 1872.

Upon her father's death, Davenport Hill travelled to Adelaide in South Australia, to visit family including her reforming cousin Emily Clark. She travelled with her sister Florence and the two of them were to stay together for life. While in Australia, the sisters did inspections of schools, prisons and reformatories. Henry Parkes served as one of their guides. Davenport Hill spoke before a commission in Sydney about the reformatory movement. She wrote a paper, titled "A Summary of the Principles of Reformatory Treatment, with a Special Reference to Girls' (printed in the Memoir)" that argued that reform treatment should emphasise independence and self-efficacy. The two sisters travelled from Australia to Egypt and Italy, returning home in 1875. During their travels, they wrote and published "What we saw in Australia". In 1878, they published a biography about their father. The two sisters lived in Hampstead. Davenport Hill left the Church of England and became a Unitarian Universalist.

== Education career ==
On 5 December 1879, Davenport Hill was elected a Progressive Party member of the school board for the City of London. She served until 1897. She sat on the industrial school committee and the school management committee. She chaired the management of Greystoke Place. She became chairman of the cooking committee and published multiple papers on the subject in education.

She was an early opposer of the school board's pension program for teachers, which was eventually abolished in 1895. She visited the United States and Canada, travelling to schools across the countries in 1888. This inspired her to introduce pianos to schools for the sake of marching and drill. She also became interested in sloyd education. She opposed the board's interest in providing meals to children and also protested the religious stances of the board, despite supporting daily religious teachings. Davenport Hill was a member of the National Froebel Foundation. She served on the board of the University College London.

== Retirement and later life ==
She retired from the board in 1897. She moved in with her sister in a home called Hillstow at Headington near Oxford. Upon her retirement, the Brentwood Industrial School was renamed the Davenport-Hill Home for Boys. Davenport Hill died at Hillstow on 5 August 1902.
