= Postage Act 1839 =

Act of the Parliament of the United Kingdom

- Act of Parliament
- Parliament of the United Kingdom
- Long title: An Act for the further Regulation of the Duties on Postage until the Fifth Day of October One thousand eight hundred and forty.
- Citation: 2 & 3 Vict. c. 52
- Territorial extent: United Kingdom

Dates
- Royal assent: 17 August 1839
- Commencement: 17 August 1839 (Note: The Acts of Parliament (Commencement) Act 1793.)
- Expired: 5 October 1840 (Note: Section 14.)
- Repealed: 1 September 1840
Other legislation
Repealed by	Post Office (Duties) Act 1840

Status: Repealed

Text of statute as originally enacted

The Postage Act 1839 (2 & 3 Vict. c. 52) was an act of the Parliament of the United Kingdom that came into effect on 17 August 1839 to regulate the postage rates of Great Britain until 5 October 1840 and led to several postal reforms, including the introduction of the Uniform Penny Post and the world's first postage stamps.

== Background ==
This was the first act in the reforms of the General Post Office that took place under the auspices of Rowland Hill. Its main objective was that within a year the cost of postage should be reduced to one penny per weight instead of heretofore being charged by the number of sheets and the distance travelled. It initiated the Fourpenny Post and within 36 days led to the drop in the cost of postage from four pence to the one penny under the Uniform Penny Post. Less than six months later the world's first postage stamps, the Penny Black and Two Penny Blue, were issued.

== Main regulations ==
The main changes to be instigated by the act were to:

- Reduce the postage rate to a uniform one penny for a determined weight
- Create proportionate rates for increased weight
- Abolish the franking privilege
- Regulate official franking
- Suspend the law in respect to the London and Dublin twopenny posts and any other penny post
- The use of the word Letter or Letters in the act shall include newspapers, any other packet, paper, article or thing transmitted by the post but not to deprive newspapers of any current privilege
- Enact the changes until 5 October 1840

== Enactment ==
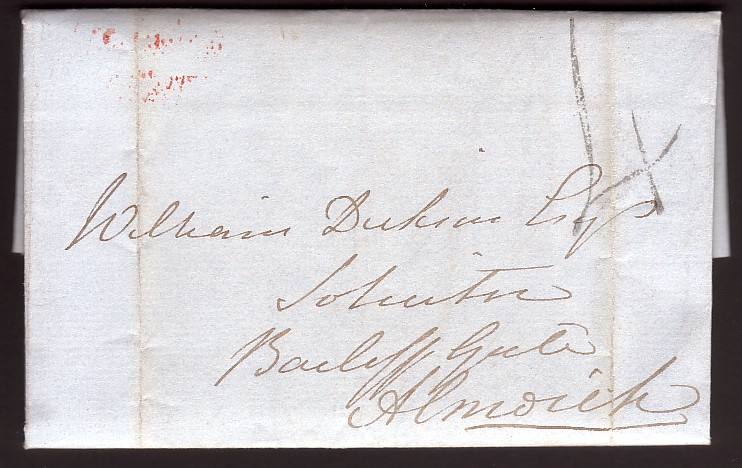
Uniform Fourpenny Post letter used on the second day with a handstruck '4' of Edinburgh posted 7 December 1839

While the act was given royal assent on 17 August 1839, the Treasury warrant to initiate the Fourpenny Post from 5 December was made on 22 November 1839 and set forth the postage rate of four-pence as the postage rate applied as follows:

- 1 postage rate up to a half-ounce letter
- 2 postage rates over half-ounce but not exceeding 1 oz.
- 4 postage rates over 1 oz. but not exceeding 2 oz.
- 6 postage rates over 2 oz. but not exceeding 4 oz.
- 8 postage rates over 4 oz. but not exceeding 8 oz.
- 2 postage rates for each additional 1 oz. over 8 oz.
- Every fraction of an ounce over 4 oz. to be charged as an additional 1 oz.
- Generally no letter weighing over 16 oz. to be forwarded by the General Post Office

On 27 December 1839 a new warrant was issued that further reduced the rate to one-penny per postage rate with the weight steps as previously listed. Several other alterations were made including the abolition of all the additional fees related to the Irish Sea crossing and the half-penny tax on letters conveyed by mail carriages with more than two wheels in Scotland.

== Subsequent developments ==
The whole act was repealed by section 1 of the Post Office (Duties) Act 1840 (3 & 4 Vict. c. 96), which came into force on 1 September 1840.
