= Nathaniel H. Alcock =

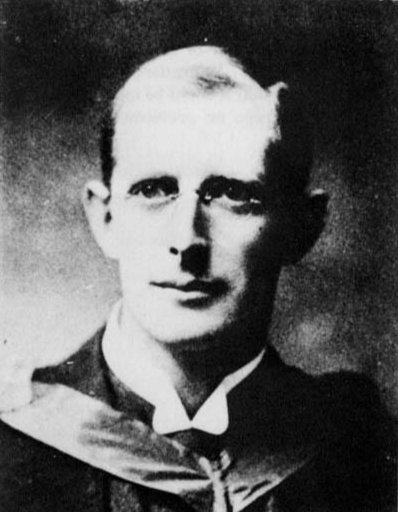
- Born: Nathaniel Henry Alcock; 12 February 1871; Letterkenny, County Donegal, Ireland
- Died: 13 June 1913 (aged 42); Montreal, Canada

Nathaniel H. Alcock (12 February 1871 – 13 June 1913) was an Irish medical doctor.

== Life and family ==
Nathaniel Henry Alcock was born on 12 February 1871 in Letterkenny, County Donegal. His father was Daniel Robert Alcock, an assistant surgeon in the Royal Navy. Alcock attended Trinity College Dublin (TCD), graduating with a BA in natural sciences in 1893, and MB, BCh, BAO and MD in June 1896.

Alcock married Nora Lilian Scott in 1905. The family migrated to Canada in 1911. Alcock died on 13 June 1913 from leukaemia. They had four children, one son and three daughters. Their son, Nathaniel Scott, became a neurologist.

== Career ==
Alcock went on to teach anatomy in Victoria College, Manchester, and physiology at TCD. In 1902 he was appointed a research fellow at the University of Marburg working with Professor Hans Horst Meyer. In January 1903, he was appointed a physiology demonstrator at the new department at the University of London under Augustus Desire Waller. Alcock took up a position as lecturer on physiology in January 1904 at St Mary's Hospital Medical School, becoming vice-dean in 1906.

In 1908, he designed an apparatus to regulate the percentage of chloroform vapour administered as an anaesthetic. Alcock was awarded a DSc in 1909 for his research in physiology. With F. O'B. Ellison he co-authored A textbook of experimental physiology (1909). In 1911 he was appointed chair of physiology at McGill University, a position he held until his death in 1913.

Alcock also conducted some natural history research in his spare time. He published a work on Irish bats with Charles Bethune Moffat in 1903.
