= Charles Edward Foister =

British botanist and plant pathologist

- Born: 17 August 1903; Cambridge, England
- Died: 23 July 1989 (aged 85)
- Education: University of Cambridge
- Occupations: Botanist; plant pathologist

Dr Charles Edward Foister FRSE (17 August 1903 – 23 July 1989) was a British botanist and plant pathologist. He was Director of Scottish Agricultural Scientific Services in Edinburgh from 1957. He specialised in lichens and fungi.

== Life ==
He was born in Cambridge in England on 17 August 1903, the son of Frederick W Foister and his wife Esther Elizabeth Smith. He was educated locally and won a place at the University of Cambridge graduating with a BA in 1925. He continued as a postgraduate taking a Diploma in Agricultural Science (1927). He later received a doctorate (PhD) from the University of Edinburgh in 1931.

He was employed as a plant pathologist in eastern Edinburgh for all of his working life. He became the official plant pathologist for the UK in 1938. He was an active member of the Botanical Society of Edinburgh.

In 1954, he was elected a Fellow of the Royal Society of Edinburgh. His proposers were Sir William Wright Smith, Stephen J Watson, Malcolm Wilson and Alexander Nelson.

He died at Colchester in Essex on 23 July 1989.

He never married and was presumed homosexual.

== Publications ==
- The Relationship of Weather to Fungus and Bacterial Diseases (1935)
- Descriptions of New Fungi Causing Economic Diseases in Scotland (1940)
- Dry Rot Disease of Potato (1952)
- Mrs N L Alcock (1972)
