= Edwin Hill (engineer) =

English postal official and inventor (1793–1876)

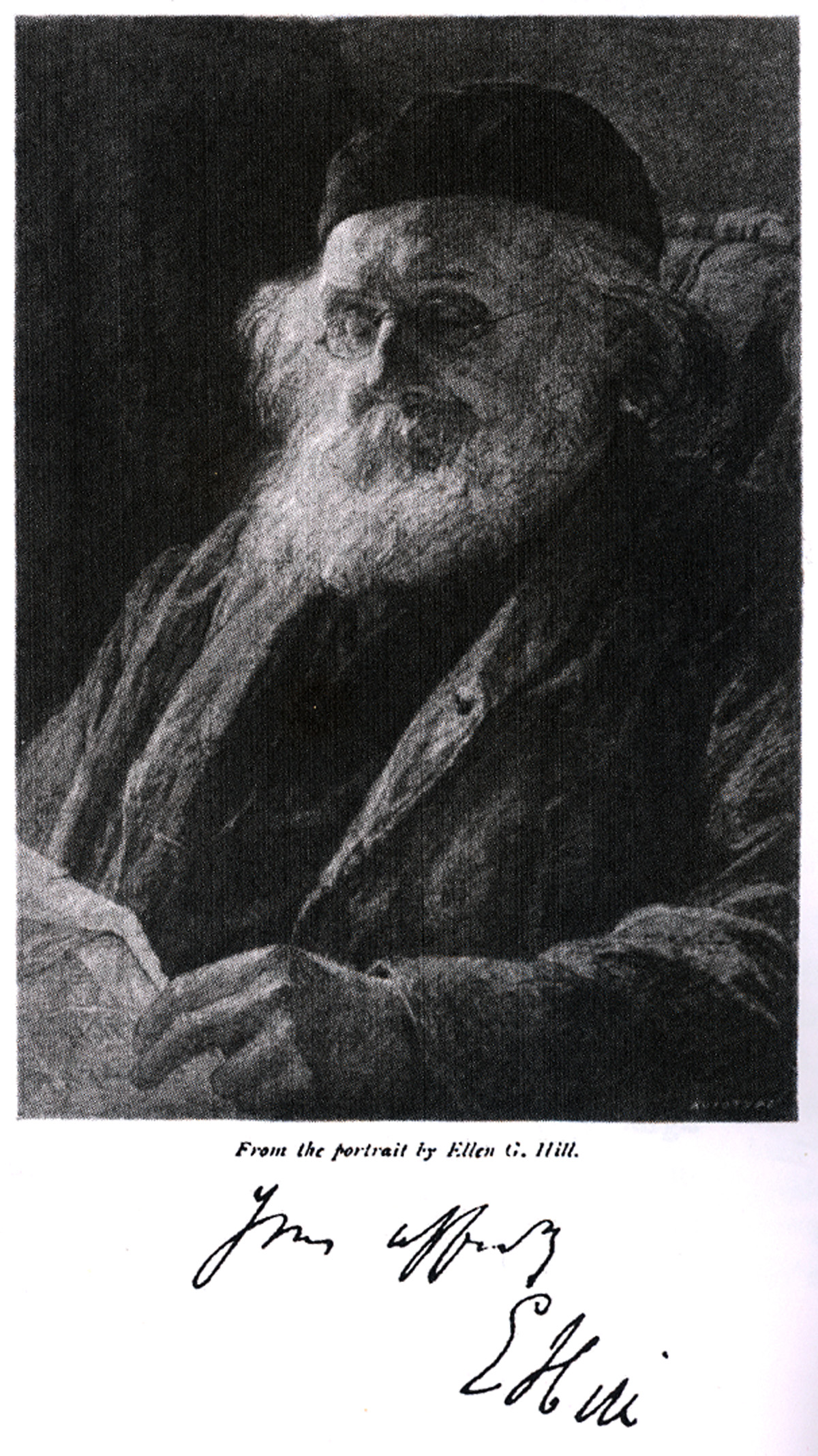
- Born: 25 November 1793; Birmingham, Warwickshire, England
- Died: 6 November 1876 (aged 82); St. Mark's Square, London, England
- Resting place: Highgate Cemetery
- Occupations: Inventor, Controller of Stamps
- Known for: Inventing first letter scale and a machine to fold envelopes

Edwin Hill (25 November 1793 - 6 November 1876) was a Victorian postal official who invented a mechanical system to make envelopes and who campaigned for legal and political change. He was the older brother of Rowland Hill.

== Early life ==
Hill was born in Birmingham, Warwickshire and educated at a school run by his father Thomas Wright Hill where he also taught when older. Later he worked at the Assay Office in Birmingham and then at a Birmingham brass-rolling mill where he became the manager.

In 1819 he married Anne Bucknall and they had ten children.

In 1827 he moved to Tottenham, London, where he managed a branch of the family school business while Rowland taught.

== Stamp Office ==
In 1840 Hill became the first British Controller of Stamps and he remained in that position until 1872.

== Inventions ==
Hill was an inveterate inventor of equipment to help the stamp department. He invented a mechanical system to make envelopes which was shown at the Great Exhibition of 1851, the patent for which was bought by Warren de la Rue to whom the machine was attributed. On his retirement a Treasury minute praised Hill's "...resourcefulness and considerable mechanical ability which had contributed so much to the success of the new postage scheme".

== Campaigns ==
Hill was one of the signatories to the notice calling a meeting on 22 January 1817 to petition for parliamentary reform and he campaigned for changes to the law relating to the handling of stolen property.

== Death ==
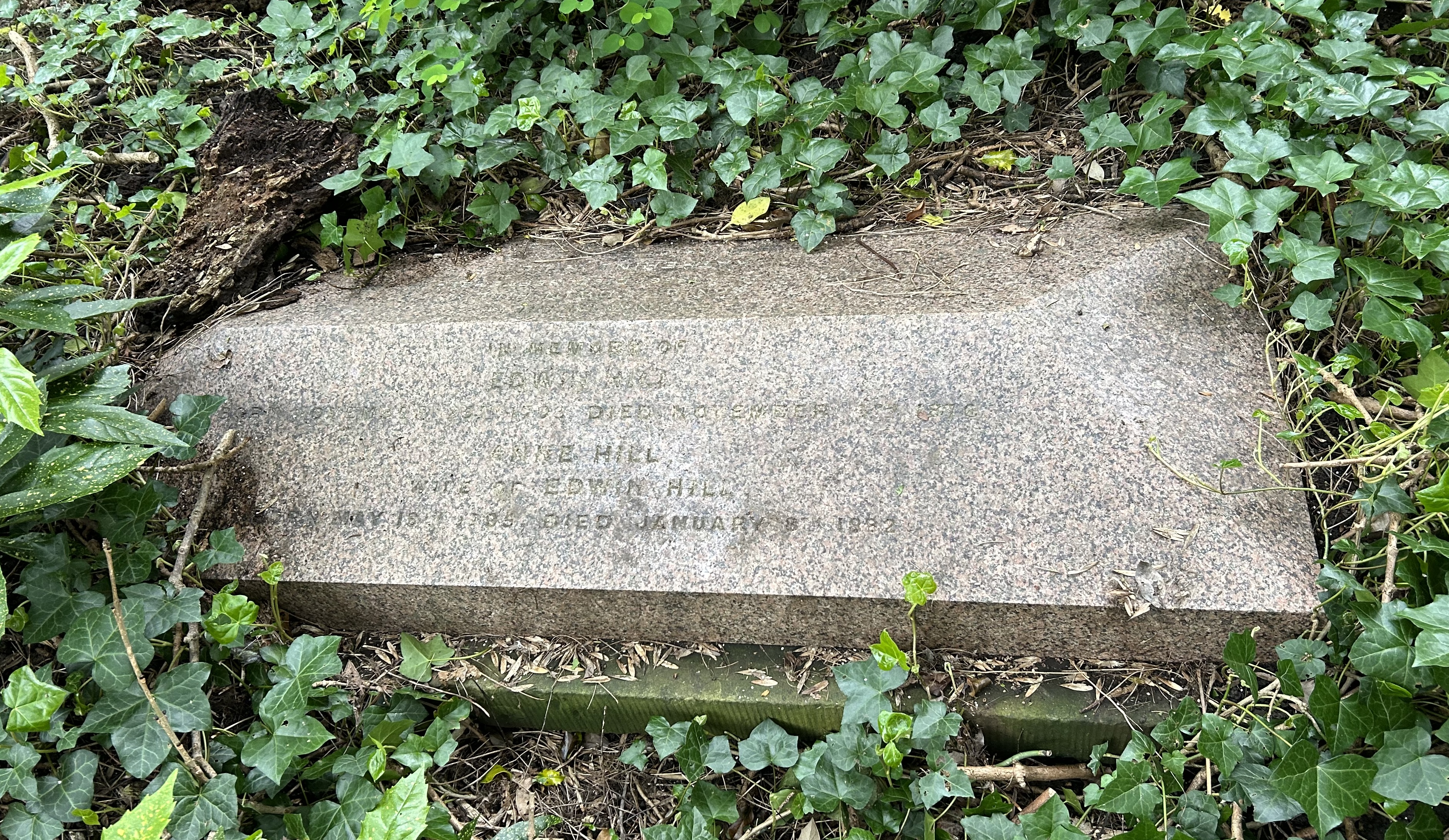
Grave of Edwin Hill in Highgate Cemetery

Hill died at home in London on 6 November 1876 and is buried at Highgate Cemetery.
