= Uniform Penny Post =

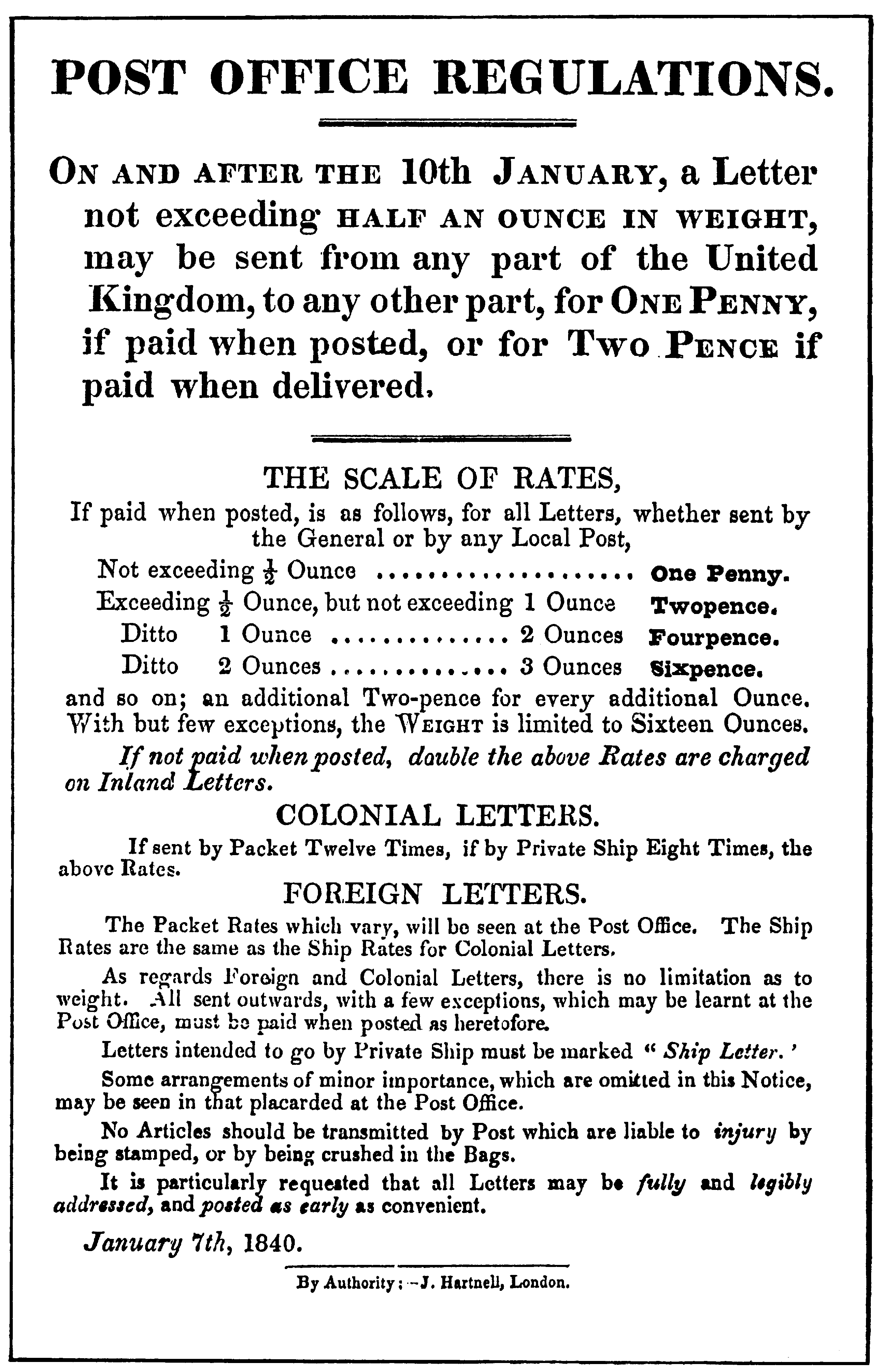
Royal Mail Post Office Regulations handbill giving details of the Uniform Penny Post, dated January 7, 1840

The Uniform Penny Post was a component of the comprehensive reform of the Royal Mail, the UK's official postal service, that took place in the 19th century. The reforms were a government initiative to eradicate the abuse and corruption of the existing service. Under the reforms, the postal service became a government monopoly, but it also became more accessible to the British population at large through setting a charge of one penny (Note: One penny in 1840 is £0.37 today.) for carriage and delivery between any two places in the United Kingdom of Great Britain and Ireland irrespective of distance.

== Campaign for reform ==
Richard Cobden and John Ramsey McCulloch, both advocates of free trade, attacked the Conservative government's policies of privilege and protection, including their archaic postal system. McCulloch, in 1833, advanced the view that "nothing contributes more to facilitate commerce than the safe, speedy and cheap conveyance of letters." The campaign for cheap postage was actually initiated by Robert Wallace, who in 1835 argued, before a governmental commission set up to investigate the problems, that greater use of the mailing system would lead to increased revenue for the government.

== Rowland Hill's reforms ==
Rowland Hill expounded his concept for the reformed service at a meeting of the commission on February 13, 1837, and published a famous pamphlet Post Office Reform: its Importance and Practicability late that year. Hill wrote this pamphlet while serving as secretary of the South Australian Colonization Commission. In 1838 Hill made a proposal to parliament in which he suggested that "the postage on all letters received in a post-town, and delivered in the same, or any other post-town in the British Isles, shall be at the uniform rate of one penny per half ounce". However, Hill did not include a specific timetable for the introduction of a "penny post" in his proposal, nor did he suggest a plan for its implementation. Nonetheless, Hill's 1838 proposal paved the way for the Post Office (Duties) Act 1840 (3 & 4 Vict. c. 96) which introduced the Uniform Penny Post.

In his proposal, Hill also called for official pre-printed envelopes and adhesive postage stamps as alternative ways of getting the sender to pay for postage, at a time when prepayment was optional. Previously, postage had depended on distance and the number of sheets of paper; now, one penny would assure delivery of an envelope and the letter it enclosed anywhere in the country provided together they satisfied the weight condition. This was a lower rate than before, when the cost of postage was usually more than 4d (four pence). The reform did not settle the issue of who paid for the postage, as it still remained optional for a number of years in spite of Hill's efforts as Secretary to the Post Office to alter the situation.

As of 2013 the value of one penny in 1840 ranges from 32p to £4.89; the latter based on mean income. It would appear that the cost to an established semi-skilled man of sending a letter in 1840 can be represented by approximately £1 in 2013 values.

This however was a lower cost than previously and made postal communication more affordable to the increasing numbers of people capable of reading and writing as a consequence of public education. Financially, the penny post scheme initially was a disaster. However, Hill made the case that if letters were cheaper to send, people, including the poorer classes, would send more of them, thus eventually profits would go up. In 1840, the first year of Penny Post, the number of letters sent in the UK more than doubled. Within 10 years, it had doubled again. The BBC states, “Hill had shown that the fortune at the bottom of the pyramid was there to be mined.” The other benefits were the encouragement and support that the availability of cheap letterpost communication gave to the development of transport links, education, commerce and social cohesion.

== See also ==
- Uniform Fourpenny Post
- Penny Black
- Postage Act 1839
- Postage stamps and postal history of Great Britain
