= Nora Lilian Alcock =

Pioneering plant pathologist

Nora Lilian Lepard Alcock
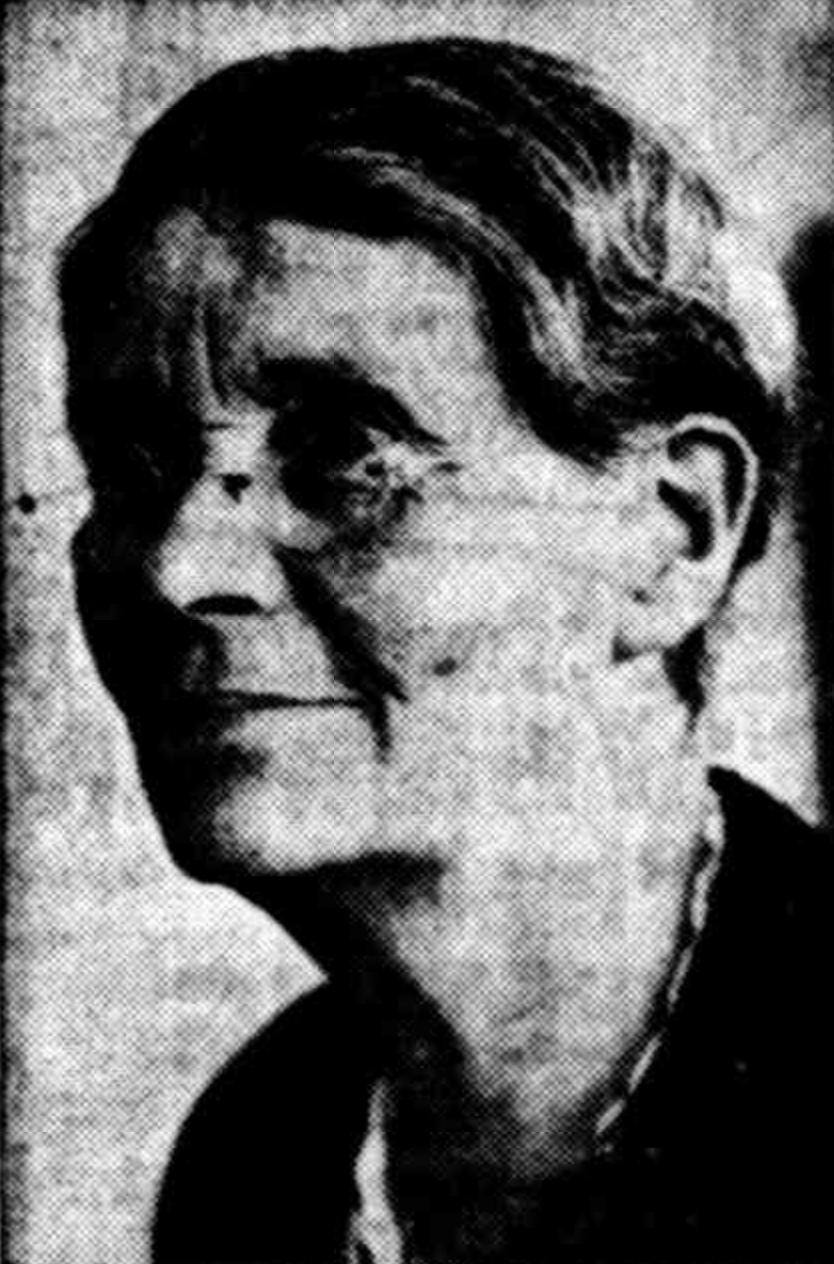
- Alcock in Australia in 1938
- Born: Nora Lilian Scott; 18 August 1874
- Died: 31 March 1972 (aged 97)
- Known for: First government-appointed plant pathologist in Scotland; Research on disease-resistant strawberries
- Spouse: Nathaniel H. Alcock
- Awards: MBE (1935)
- Scientific career
- Fields: Plant pathology, mycology
- Institutions: University of London; Kew Gardens; Department of Agriculture for Scotland
- Author abbrev. (botany): N.L.Alcock

Nora Lilian Alcock, also known as Nora Lilian Lepart and Nora Lilian Leopard, (18 August 1874 – 31 March 1972) was a pioneer in the field of plant pathology and the first government-appointed plant pathologist in Scotland.

== Life ==
Nora Lilian Scott was born in 1874, the daughter of Sir John Scott, the Judicial Advisor to the Khedive of Egypt, and Edgeworth Leonora Hill. It appears she had no formal higher education. She married Nathaniel Henry Alcock, a radiologist, in 1905 and moved to Canada. When he died of cancer in 1913, she and her four children returned to Britain.

== Work ==
Upon her return to London, Alcock obtained a post at the Plant Pathology Laboratory of the Ministry of Agriculture, Kew Gardens. During her appointment, Alcock developed expertise in mycology under the directorships of Sir John Fryer, John Ramsbottom, and Professor Dame Helen Gwynne-Vaughan. Alcock became a fellow of the Linnean Society in 1922, and in 1924, she moved to Edinburgh for the position of plant pathologist in the Department of Agriculture and Fisheries. Her post was based at the Royal Botanic Garden Edinburgh and focused on using healthy seeds to increasing food production. She retired in 1937. The following year she visited Australia, where she spent six months studying local flora.

== Honours and recognition ==
As a result of her research on fungal diseases, in particular red core disease in strawberries, Alcock was awarded an MBE in 1935. Her work developed disease-resistant strains and catalogued seed-borne diseases.

In 1924 Alcock became the first person to hold the new post of Plant Pathologist in the Department of Agriculture and Fisheries.

Her biography was written by Charles Edward Foister.

A memorial plaque dedicated to Alcock can be found at the Royal Botanic Gardens of Edinburgh.

== Other accomplishments ==
During the Second World War, she taught botany to prisoners of war. She was a member of the National Federation of Business and Professional Women's Clubs and the Edinburgh Soroptimists.
