= Uniform fourpenny post =

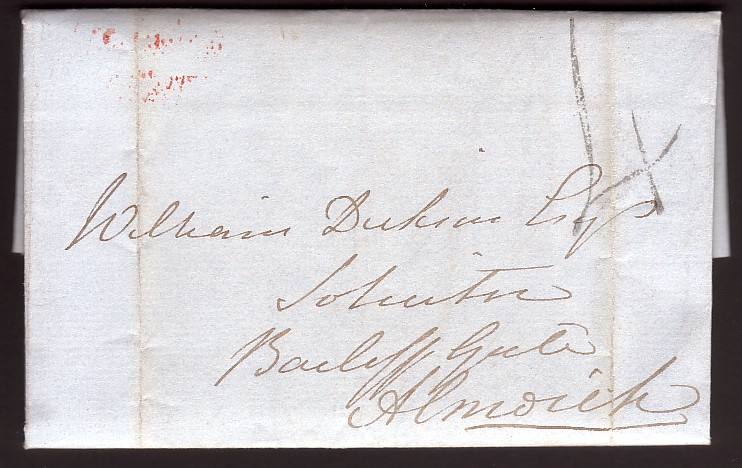
Second day of use with Edinburgh handstruck 4

The uniform fourpenny post was a short-lived uniform pre-paid letter rate in United Kingdom of Great Britain and Ireland that lasted for 36 days from 5 December 1839 until 9 January 1840. The Uniform Fourpenny Post was the first component of the comprehensive reform to the Royal Mail postal service that took place in the 19th century.

== Legislation ==
The Postage Act 1839 (2 & 3 Vict. c. 52) was passed on 17 August 1839 in which the Penny Postage system was passed. It gave the Treasury until October 1840 to introduce the system. Public reaction to the interim rate of 4d was unfavourable and they felt cheated that the agreed reduction to the uniform rate of 1d had not taken place. This resulted in the abolition of the Fourpenny Post and the debut of the uniform penny post on 10 January 1840 when 1d was charged for pre-paid one ounce letters. This was followed by the issuance of labels to prepay postage in May 1840: the Penny Black and Two Penny Blue stamps.

== Details ==
From 5 December 1839 until 9 January 1840, a uniform charge of 4d was levied for pre-paid letters up to half an ounce in weight instead of postage being calculated by distance and number of sheets of paper. One ounce letters were charged 8d and each additional ounce, up to 16 ounces, cost 8d. Unpaid was charged double the pre-paid rates. For mail whose rates were already less than 4d, the existing lower rates applied to those letters.

The quantity of letters carried increased significantly. For the week ending 29 November 1839, the London post office carried 1,585,973 letters. For the week ending 22 December, the quantity was 2,008,687 and by the week ending 23 February 1840 they carried 3,199,637.

== Postal markings ==
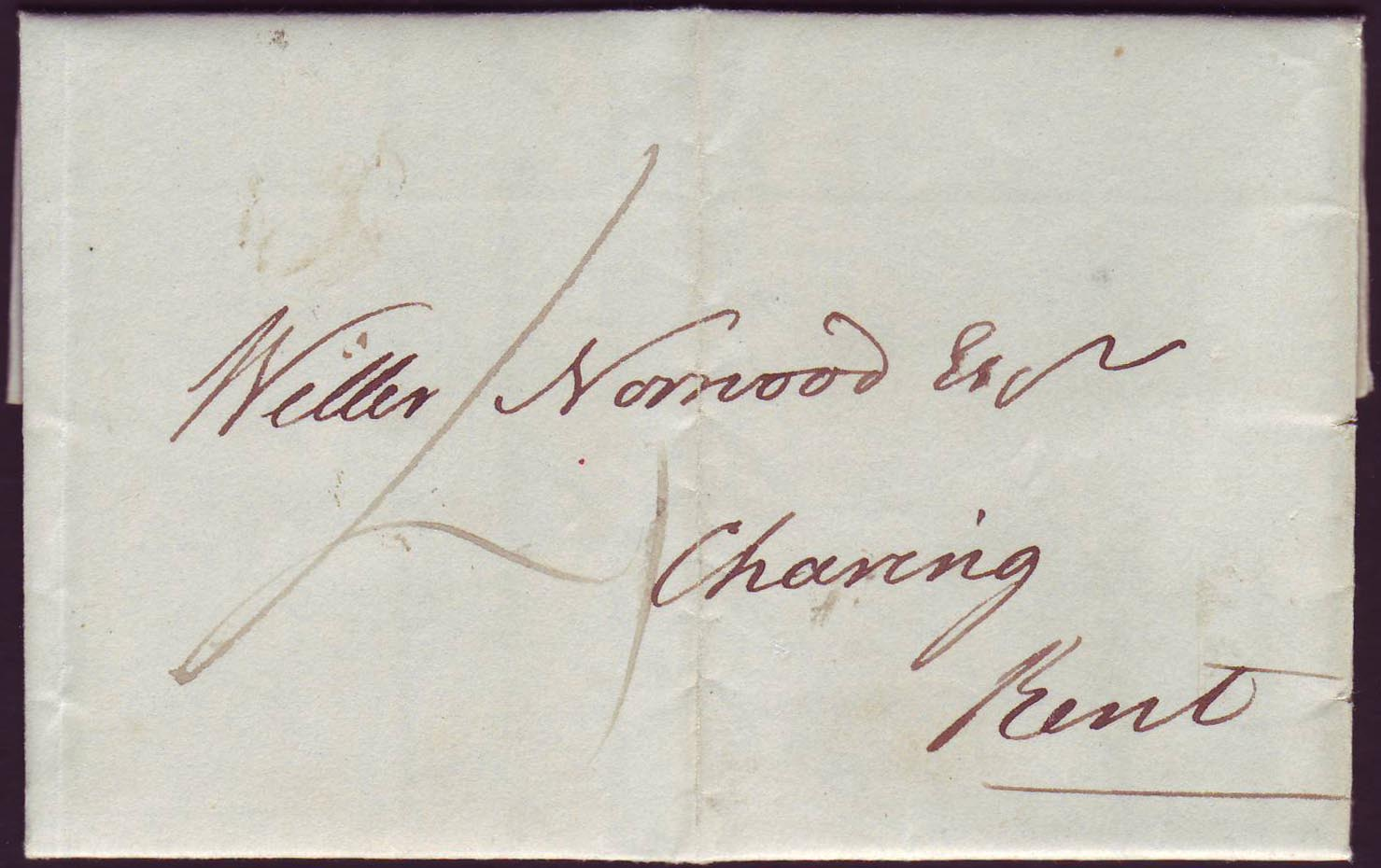
Last day of use showing manuscript 4, used locally within Kent

Mail posted during the fourpenny post period was marked with a figure 4 applied either in manuscript, or with a handstamp that was issued to a limited number of cities in Great Britain and Ireland. No handstamp has been recorded for London, even though Dublin, Glasgow, and Edinburgh were issued with handstamps. Some towns appear to have obtained their handstamps from unofficial sources.
