= Letter scale =

Scale used for weighing letters

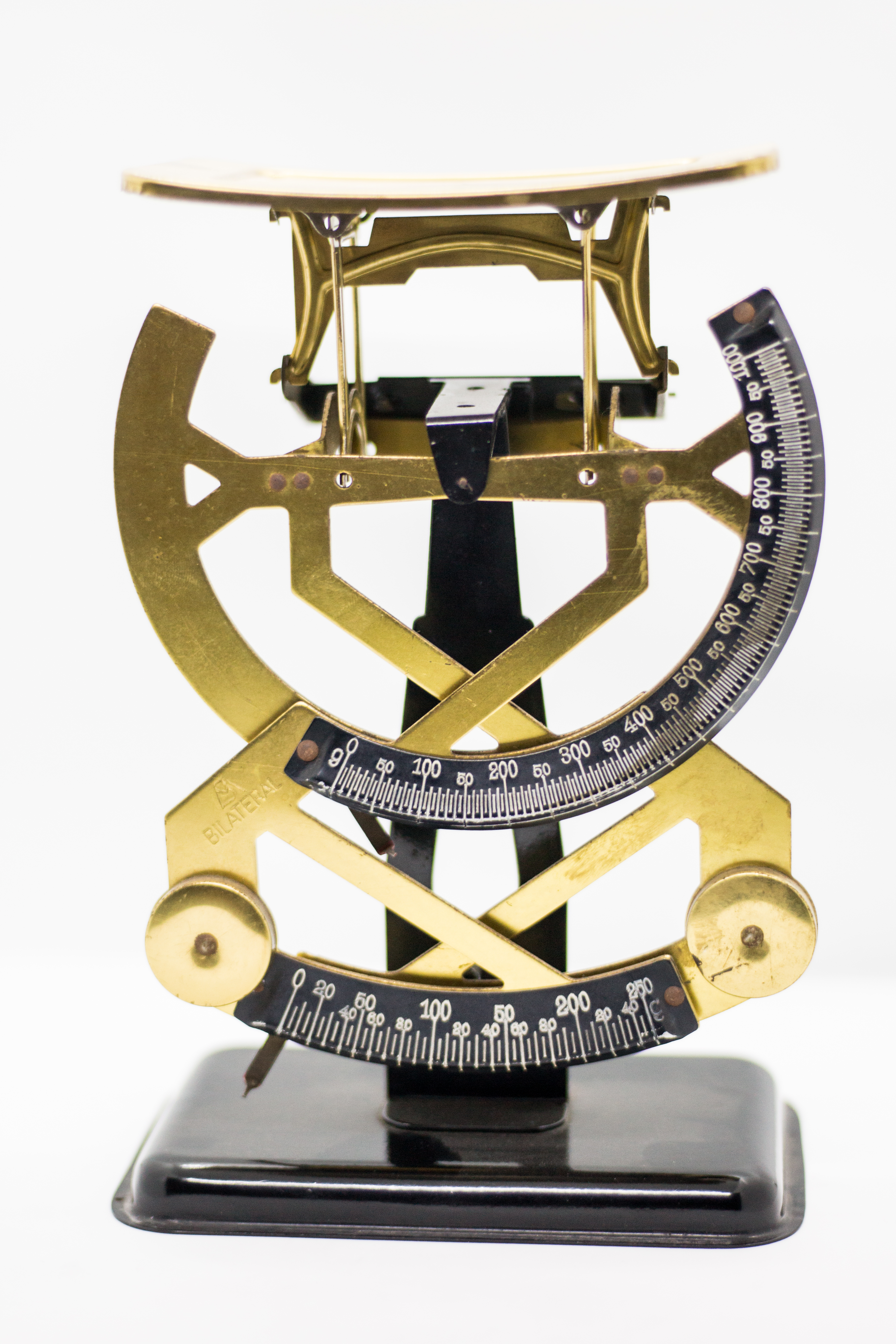
Bilateral letter scale, collections of the Maison Losseau.

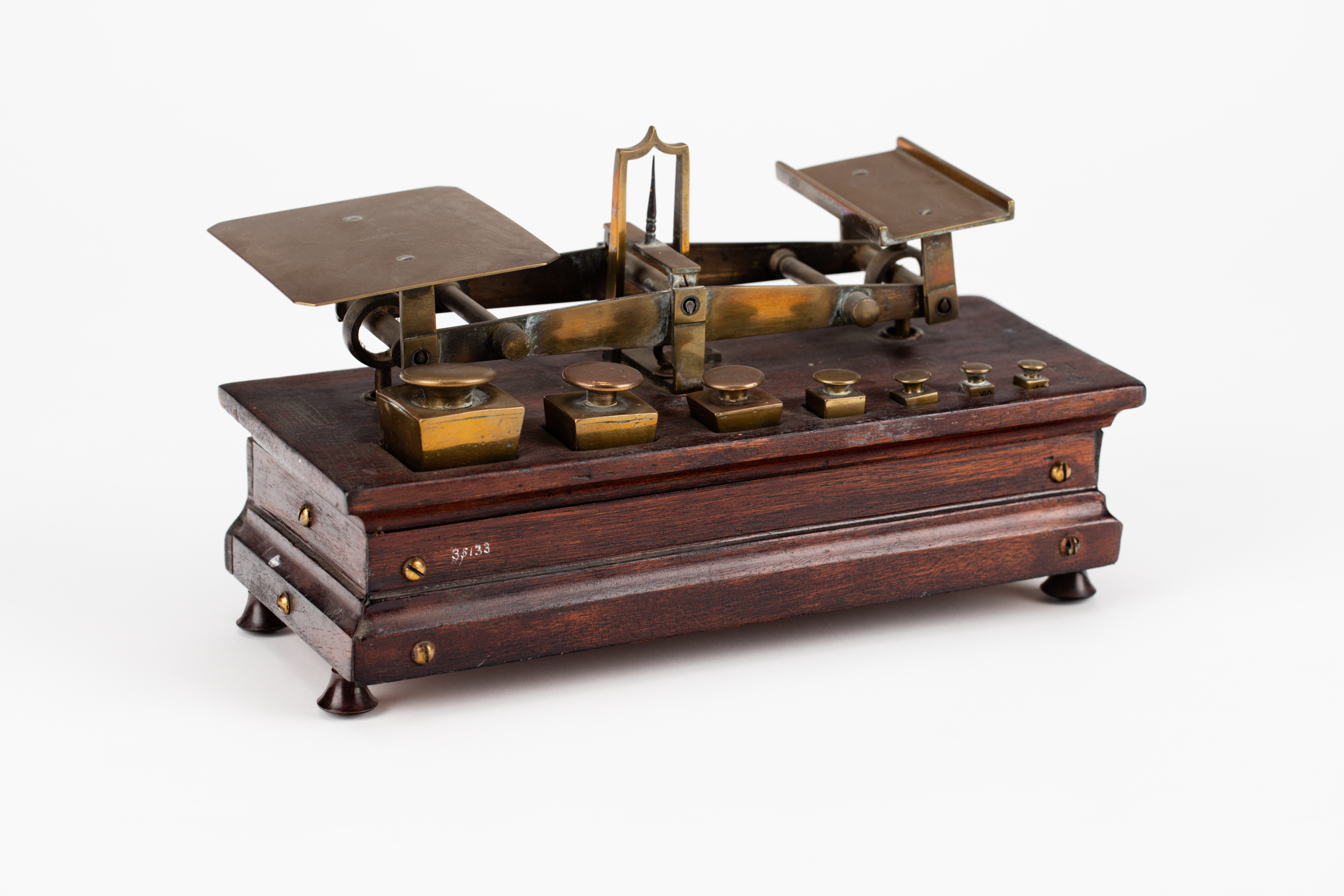
19th Century letter scale used at the Mangōnui Post Office

A letter scale is a weighing scale used for weighing letters in order to determine the correct amount of postage. Until the 1990s most letter scales were mechanical, but today electronic scales are the most common.
