= Matthew Davenport Hill =

English lawyer, prison reform campaigner and MP

Matthew Davenport Hill (6 August 1792 – 7 June 1872) was an English lawyer, prison reform campaigner, and MP.

== Life ==
Hill was born at Birmingham. His father, Thomas Wright Hill, ran the private schools Hazelwood and Bruce Castle. He was a brother of the postal reformer Sir Rowland Hill and the prison inspector Frederic Hill. He taught in his father's school. In 1819 was called to the bar at Lincoln's Inn. In 1832 he was elected one of the Liberal Members of Parliament for Kingston upon Hull, but he lost his seat at the next election in 1834. On the incorporation of Birmingham in 1839 he was appointed as the town's recorder (chief magistrate); and in 1851 he was appointed commissioner in bankruptcy for the Bristol district. Taking an interest in questions relating to the treatment of criminal offenders, he publicly aired opinions which were the means of introducing many important reforms in the methods of dealing with crime, drawing notably upon the theories of the Scottish penal reformer, Alexander Maconochie. His book Mettray (1855) describes the Mettray Penal Colony with its then new approach to dealing with young delinquents.

One of his principal coadjutors in these reforms was his brother Frederic Hill (1803–1896), whose Amount, Causes and Remedies of Crime, the result of his experience as inspector of prisons for Scotland. marked an era in the methods of prison discipline. Hill was one of the chief promoters of the Society for the Diffusion of Useful Knowledge, and the originator of the Penny Magazine. He died at Stapleton, near Bristol.

In 1868 the West of England Suffrage Society, part of the National Society for Women's Suffrage, was formed at his house. His daughter Florence was one of the first members, and later members included Agnes Beddoe, Emily and Elizabeth Sturge.

Two of his daughters wrote a biography of their father in 1878.

== Family ==
Hill married Margaret Bucknall on 3 November 1819. Their children were Alfred Hill (born 1821), Rosamond Davenport Hill (born in Chelsea in 1825), Florence Davenport Hill (also born in Chelsea in 1828), Matthew Berkeley Hill, and Joanna Margaret Hill (born in Hampstead in 1836/37).

== Works ==
His principal works are:

- Practical Suggestions to the Founders of Reformatory Schools (1855)
- Suggestions for the Repression of Crime (1857), consisting of charges addressed to the grand juries of Birmingham
- Mettray (1855)
- Papers on the Penal Servitude Acts (1864)
- Journal of a Third Visit to the Convict Gaols, Refuges and Reformatories of Dublin (1865)
- Addresses delivered at the Birmingham and Midland Institute (1867).

== See also ==
- Rosamond Davenport Hill

Parliament of the United Kingdom
Preceded by George Schonswar; William Battie-Wrightson	Member of Parliament for Kingston upon Hull; 1832 – 1835; With: William Hutt	Succeeded by David Carruthers; William Hutt
