= Thomas Wright Hill =

English mathematician and schoolmaster

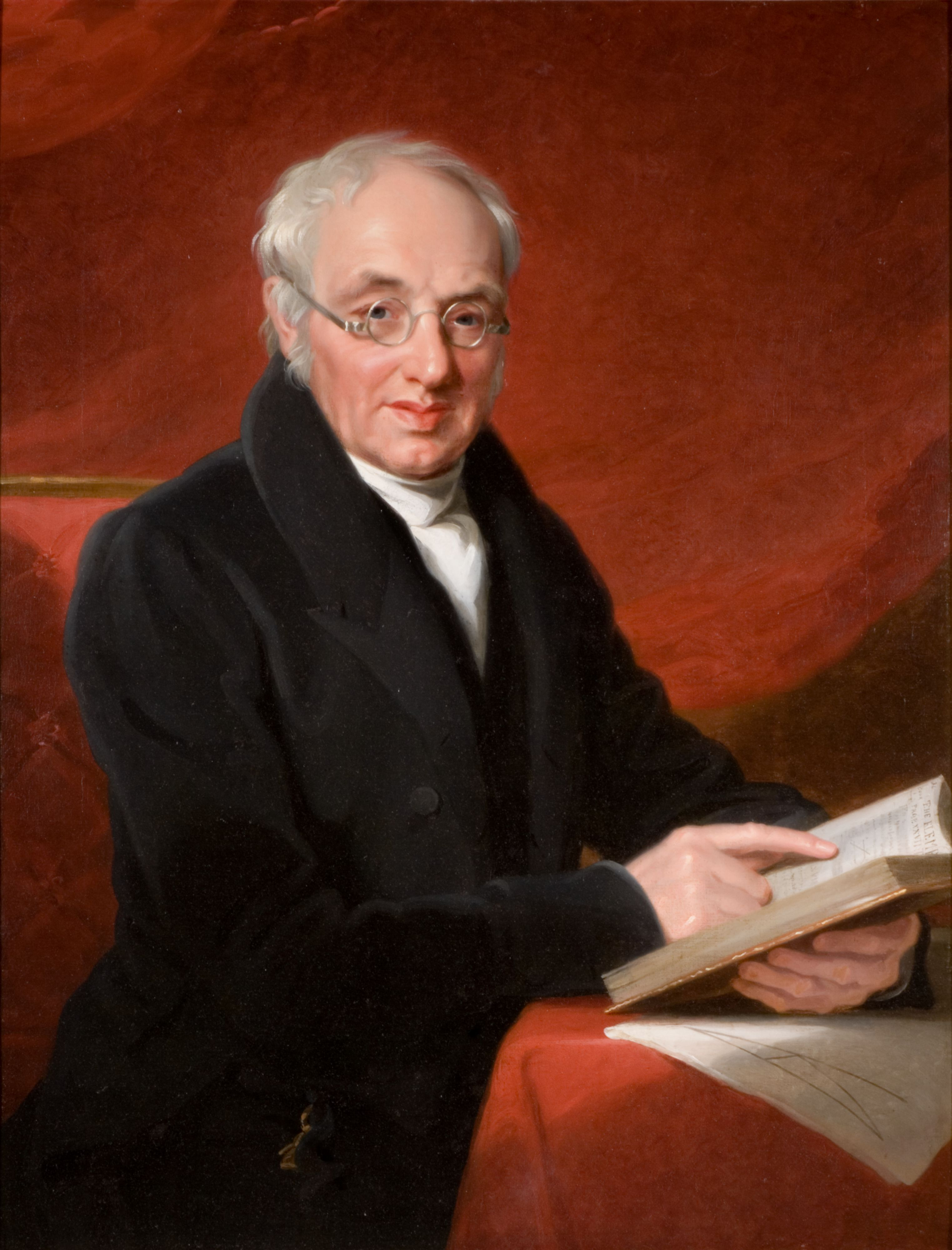
Thomas Wright Hill by Mary Martha Pearson, 1831.

Thomas Wright Hill (24 April 1763 in Kidderminster – 13 June 1851 in Tottenham) was an English mathematician and schoolmaster. He is credited as inventing the single transferable vote in 1819. His son Rowland, famous as the originator of the modern postal system, introduced STV in 1840 into the world's first public election, for the Adelaide City Council, in which the principle of proportional representation was applied.

In 1791, Thomas Wright Hill courageously tried to save the apparatus of Dr Joseph Priestley from a mob in the Birmingham 'Church and King' riots —the offer was declined.

He was interested in astronomy, being a Fellow of the Royal Astronomical Society, and in computers, as is shown by a letter of his to Charles Babbage, dated 23 March 1836, among the Babbage manuscripts at the British Library, returning some logarithm tables that he had borrowed and adding "How happy I shall be when I can see such a work verified and enlarged by your divine machine".

== Parentage and background ==
Hill was the sixth child of James Hill, of Kidderminster, Worcestershire, a baker and dealer in corn for horses, and his second wife, Sarah, daughter of John Symonds, of Kidderminster, who was in business as an apothecary and drysalter. The Hill family had been freeholders and tradesmen for the past three generations, descendants of Walter Hill (d. 1693), a "considerable landowner" of Abberley, Worcestershire (although the Dictionary of National Biography gives him the name Walter and places him at Abberley, per Hill's own recollection, this man -- whose first name he did not specify -- was of "the neighbourhood of Cleobury Mortimer", Shropshire). Favouring the issue of his second marriage, the children of the first marriage were left to fend for themselves. One son, also Walter Hill, settled at Kidderminster, entering business as a hatter; Walter's son John, also of Kidderminster, a tailor, was father of James Hill. Hill believed his family to be related to the poet and satirist Samuel Butler.

== Hill and education ==
Hill started work as a brassfounder, but was more interested in intellectual pursuits, so in 1802 he bought a boys' school on Lionel Street, Birmingham moving it to Hill Top, Gough Street. In 1819, it moved again to a new purpose-built school designed by Rowland at Hazelbrook called Hazelwood on Hagley Road in Edgbaston.

From the start the school seems to have been out of the ordinary. In its original prospectus Hill says that "he will make it his study to excite [his pupils'] reasoning powers, and to induce in them habits of voluntary application ... he will always endeavour, by kindness and patience, to secure for himself their affection and esteem"; perhaps not revolutionary aims nowadays, but this was more than 25 years before Thomas Arnold became headmaster of Rugby or Charles Dickens wrote Nicholas Nickleby. It is also noteworthy that he was offering "instruction in art and science".

At Hazelwood School, with his sons now bearing a full share in its running, it became a school in which the rules were formed by a committee of the boys, elected by the boys, and enforced by the boys' own law court. Whether or not that is a good way to run a school, the amazing thing is that it existed at all at that time.

In 1827 a London branch of the school was opened at Bruce Castle, Tottenham, and within a few years all the Hazelwood students had transferred to Bruce Castle, which had been taken over almost entirely by his sons. Hazelwood then became the home of Francis Clark and his wife Caroline (daughter of Thomas Wright Hill) and their large and growing family. They remained there for fifteen years before emigrating to South Australia.

== Political views and activities ==
Thomas Hill and his sons had strong political views which, at that time, were certainly radical, but always with the conviction that reforms had to come by persuasion, and constitutionally, not by violence. During the agitation leading up to the Reform Act 1832, the fifth son Frederic Hill was freed from duties at the school to devote his time to an active part in the struggle as part of the Birmingham Union. A letter to his son Edwin, dated 15 May 1832, says "These my dear boy are stirring times ... the enthusiasm and unanimity of the mass who form the Birmingham Union is at once delightful and astonishing. I hope that it will be kept quite within the law. Let the honour of a vigour surmounting that boundary belong to our adversaries; they will not find such forbearance as they may have met with in days past". As his contribution to the cause "I am abstaining from tea, coffee, sugar etc., as taxed articles. Would that the massive unions would concur. The revenue then would soon require parliamentary help, and funds would be reserved for useful purposes. But this kind of passive procedure is too much to hope for as a general procedure".

He does not seem to have disapproved of a little political trickery, provided the right side was doing it. Writing to his wife, dated 11 May 1831, about the "patriotic fellows of Haddington" including her brother, he says "Their district has five boroughs which choose a member of parliament by one [delegate] from each borough. Haddington was firm and Jedburgh was firm in the good cause. Dunbar was Rotten and the same was North Berwick. Lauder had seven good men in the council out of sixteen. By excellent management the men of Haddington brought away two councilmen from Lauder and entertained them until the business was accomplished, so that now three delegates out of the five are sound reformers ... It is a glorious victory and a proud thing for us to have so near a relative bearing such a part in it".

In spite of radical views, he evidently thought well of King George III, for in a letter dated 9 February 1820, just after George IV's accession, he wrote to his son Matthew "How did your taste accord with bell-ringing and huzzas at the King's proclamation? To me, connected as it was with the death of our late aged and virtuous monarch it was revolting, even to hear of; I saw nothing of the pageantry".

== Hill and the single transferable vote ==
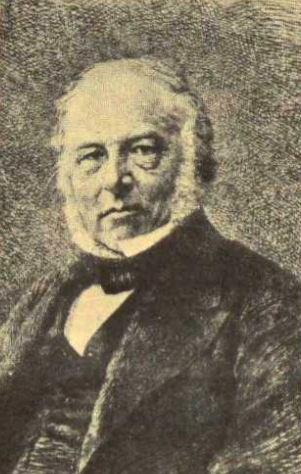
Depiction of Thomas Wright Hill in Clarence Hoag's Proportional Representation

In 1819, Thomas and Rowland were instrumental in founding the Society for Literary and Scientific Improvement of Birmingham. The Society's bylaws include a description of Hill's method of proportional representation, the earliest known version of the single transferable vote:

X. At the first meeting in April, and also in October, a Committee shall be elected, which shall consist of at least one fifth of the members of the society. The mode of election shall be as follows. A ticket shall be delivered to each member present, with his own name at the head of it, immediately under which he shall write the name of the member whom he may wish to represent him in the Committee. The votes thus given shall be delivered to the president, who, after having assorted them, shall report to the meeting the number of votes given for each nominee. Every one who has five votes shall be declared a member of the committee; if there are more than five votes given to any one person, the surplus votes, (to be selected by lot) shall be returned to the electors whose names they bear, for the purpose of making other nominations, and this process shall be repeated till no surplus votes remain, when all the inefficient votes shall be returned to the respective electors, and the same routine shall be gone through a second time, and also a third time if necessary; when if a number is elected, equal in all to one half of the number of which the committee should consist, they shall be a committee; and if at the close of the meeting the number is not filled up, by unanimous votes of five for each member of the committee, given by those persons whose votes were returned to them at the end of the third election, then this committee shall have the power, and shall be required, to choose persons to fill up their number; and the constituents of each member so elected shall, if necessary, be determined by lot. …

According to Hill's great-great-great grandson David Hill (also a reform activist) the first STV election actually took place on 18 December 1819 one month after the establishment of the society.

Hill's grandson (and Rowland's nephew) George Birkbeck Norman Hill wrote, "The plan of election had been devised by his [Rowland's] father who … was strongly in favour of the representation of minorities."

In 1821, Hill used an informal version of proportional representation in his school.

…[Hill's] pupils were asked to elect a committee by standing beside the boy they liked best. This first produced a number of unequal groups, but soon the boys in the largest groups came to the conclusion that not all of them were actually necessary for the election of their favourite and some moved on to help another candidate, while on the other hand the few supporters of an unpopular boy gave him up as hopeless and transferred themselves to the candidate they considered the next best. The final result was that a number of candidates equal to the number required for the committee were each surrounded by the same number of supporters, with only two or three boys left over who were dissatisfied with all those elected. This is an admirable example of the use of STV.

Although this seems likely to be true, when Enid Lakeman was asked for the source of it she could not remember it. It would be wise to regard it with caution until an original reference can be found.

== Posthumous publications ==
Following his death various papers that he had left behind were published in two booklets. The first has contents:

1. Notes of Mr. Hill's Ancestors (by himself, unfinished)
2. Autobiography (unfinished)
3. Continuation of Mr. Hill's Life, by his Son, Matthew Davenport Hill
4. Selections from a Diary kept by Mr. Frederic Hill
5. Brief Memoirs
6. Lines written in an Album

The second has contents:

1. Brief Memoir
2. Lecture on the Articulation of Speech
3. Phonotypy by Modification
4. Phonotypy. Another plan
5. Short-hand
6. Definition of a Straight Line
7. Numerical Nomenclature
8. Scheme for conducting elections
9. Easy Calculations for Matching the Days of the Month with the Days of the Week in Dates

== Family ==
Thomas Wright Hill married Sarah Lea (1765–1842) on 29 July 1791 at St. Martin's Church, Birmingham and had 8 children:

1. Matthew Davenport Hill (1792–1872), the criminal law reformer
2. Edwin Hill (1793–1876), mechanical inventor and writer on currency
3. Rowland Hill (1795–1879), the postal reformer
4. Arthur Hill (1798–1885), headmaster of Bruce Castle School
5. Caroline Hill (1800–1877), married Francis Clark and in 1850 emigrated to Adelaide, South Australia
6. Frederic Hill (1803–1896), inspector of prisons, assistant secretary of Post Office
7. William Howard Hill (1805–1830)
8. Sarah Hill (1807–1840)

== Sources ==
- Science and Education: A Note - W. H. G. Armytage, Notes and Records of the Royal Society of London, Vol. 12, No. 2 (Dec., 1957), pp. 226–229
- JSTOR - British Journal of Educational Studies February 1980 (first page)
- Originals of the letters quoted (other than that in the British Library) are in the possession of I. D. Hill (great-great-great grandson of T. W. Hill)
