= Frederic Hill (prison inspector) =

British prison inspector

Frederic Hill (29 June 1803 – 1896) was a prison inspector in Scotland and England, and a social reformer.

== Early life and education ==
Frederic Hill was born at Hill Top, a house and school at the summit of Gough Street, Birmingham, the sixth child of Thomas Wright Hill and Sarah, his wife, whose maiden name was Lea. He was educated in the small school run by his father, becoming an assistant teacher there at the age of thirteen.

In 1819 the family moved from Birmingham to Edgbaston and a bigger, better school which they named ‘Hazelwood’. Frederic became involved with the movement for political reform with his brothers, Rowland, who would introduce the Penny Post, and Matthew, who would become an MP for Hull. The people were not represented by Parliament, but only a section of the ruling class, mainly the land-owning aristocracy. Political Unions were set up all around the country to press for change and Frederic became a prominent member of the Birmingham Union. As a result of this pressure the Reform Act 1832 was passed.

== Career ==
Frederic read law for several years and was admitted to the Bar in 1834. Two years later Frederic obtained the post of parliamentary secretary to Mr. Sergeant Wilde (afterwards Lord Truro). As part of his brief he had to provide his employer with accurate information on any subject on which he intended to speak. In 1835 the Duke of Richmond introduced into Parliament a bill to appoint inspectors of prisons, four for England and one for Scotland. Frederic Hill decided to apply.

Frederic Hill realized that he needed advice before jumping into the stormy seas of the Scottish prison system. He visited Elizabeth Fry who, with her brother, Joseph Gurney, had written a bookabout the state of Scottish prisons in 1819. She told him that although there had been changes, improvement was still much needed.

. . . no airing-grounds; no change of rooms, tubs in the prisoners’ cells for the reception of every kind of filth; black holes; no religious services; jailers living away from their prisons, consequently an impossibility of any inspection and an almost total absence of care; free communication through the windows with the public.

Hill made various suggestions to Lord John Russell, one of the most important being that the management of all the prisons in Scotland should be placed under one directing authority. As a result of this recommendation, the Prisons (Scotland) Act 1839 (2 & 3 Vict. c. 42) appointed a board of directors of prisons “invested with Power to Erect and maintain proper Prisons, and regulate the Discipline and Management of all Prisons in Scotland, and for raising the necessary Funds by means of a general Assessment on Property within the several Counties and Burghs in manner hereinafter provided.”

Frederic Hill's campaign to improve the prisons has been described as "relentless," and his tenure as Inspector "resulted in a penal revolution in Scotland."

1839 was an exciting year for him as it was then he met his future wife, Martha Cowper, author of The Parents' Cabinet of Amusement and Instruction. She was as concerned about social reform as Frederic and took a great interest in his work as a prison inspector. They married in 1840 beginning, as he later recorded, “nearly fifty years of uninterrupted connubial happiness.”

In 1847, after twelve years in Scotland, Frederic applied to be an inspector of English prisons. His district encompassed the whole of the north of England and North Wales. He was immediately faced with a system that had seen little in the way of reform and where several governors were unfit for their posts. Although he pressed for change he found a great resistance to his ideas and became dispirited. His brother, Rowland, asked him to accept the post of assistant secretary at the Post Office, an offer which was timely and gratefully received. He moved to Hampstead with his wife and two daughters, Constance and Ellen. Although no longer an inspector of prisons, Frederic retained an interest, connecting himself with the Law Amendment Society, the Metropolitan Discharged Prisoners' Aid Society and the Reform and Refuge Union.

Both Frederic and his wife Martha were active in campaigns for women's rights and the abolition of slavery.

== Later life ==
Frederic Hill retired from public life in 1876, though he still retained a lively interest in various societies and charitable committees. He died in November 1896. A letter in The Times called him "a reformer to the last."

== Works ==
- National Education, its Present State and Prospects, 1836
- Crime, its Amount, Causes and Remedies, 1853
- Parliamentary Reform. How the Representation may be amended safely, gradually and efficiently. (essay), 1865
- Frederic Hill, an autobiography, edited by Constance Hill, 1894
