= Rowland Hill =

Devisor of the British postal system (1795–1879)

Sir Rowland Hill KCB FRS
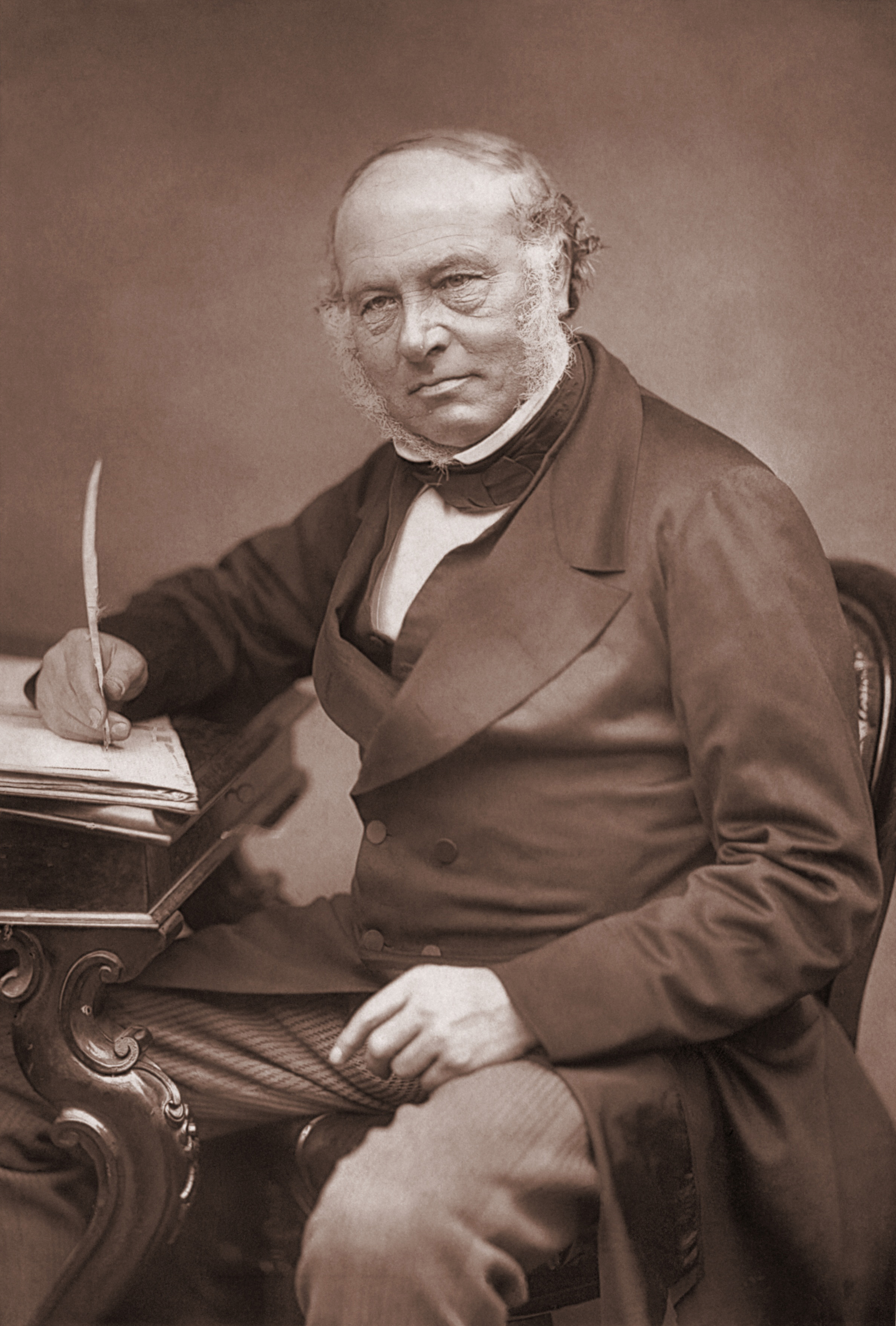
- Born: 3 December 1795; Kidderminster, Worcestershire, England
- Died: 27 August 1879 (aged 83); Hampstead, London, England
- Resting place: Westminster Abbey
- Occupations: Schoolteacher, social reformer, postal administrator
- Known for: Uniform Penny Post
- Awards: Albert Medal (1864)

Sir Rowland Hill, KCB, FRS (3 December 1795 – 27 August 1879) was an English teacher, inventor and social reformer. He campaigned for a comprehensive reform of the postal system, based on the concept of Uniform Penny Post and his solution of pre-payment, facilitating the safe, speedy and cheap transfer of letters. Hill later served as a government postal official, and he is usually credited with originating the basic concepts of the modern postal service, including the invention of the postage stamp.

Hill made the case that if letters were cheaper to send, people, including the poorer classes, would send more of them, thus eventually profits would go up. Proposing an adhesive stamp to indicate pre-payment of postage – with the first being the Penny Black – in 1840, the first year of Penny Post, the number of letters sent in the UK more than doubled. Within 10 years, it had doubled again. Within three years postage stamps were introduced in Switzerland and Brazil, a little later in the US, and by 1860, they were used in 90 countries.

== Personal life ==
Rowland Hill was born in Blackwell Street, Kidderminster, Worcestershire, England. Rowland's father, Thomas Wright Hill, was an innovator in education and politics, including among his friends Joseph Priestley, Tom Paine and Richard Price.

Hill worked at the Assay Office in Birmingham and painted landscapes in his spare time.

In 1827, he married Caroline Pearson, originally from Wolverhampton, who died on 27 May 1881. Together they had four children: three daughters (Eleanor, Clara and Louisa), and one son (Pearson).

== Educational reform ==
In 1819 he moved his father's school "Hill Top" from central Birmingham, establishing the Hazelwood School, at Edgbaston, an affluent neighbourhood of Birmingham, as an "educational refraction of Priestley's ideas". Hazelwood was to provide a model for public education for the emerging middle classes, aiming for useful, pupil-centred education which would give sufficient knowledge, skills and understanding to allow a student to continue self-education through a life "most useful to society and most happy to himself". The school, which Hill and his brothers designed, included innovations such as a science laboratory, a swimming pool, and forced air heating. In their Plans for the Government and Liberal Instruction of Boys in Large Numbers Drawn from Experience (1822, titled Public Education in a second edition in 1825), the brothers argued that kindness, instead of caning, and moral influence, rather than fear, should be the predominant forces in school discipline. Students were largely self-governing.

Hazelwood gained international attention when French education leader and editor Marc Antoine Jullien, former secretary to Maximilien de Robespierre, visited and wrote about the school in the June 1823 issue of his journal Revue encyclopédique. Jullien even transferred his son there. Hazelwood so impressed Jeremy Bentham that in 1827 a branch of the school was created at Bruce Castle in Tottenham, London. In 1833, the original Hazelwood School closed and its educational system was continued at the new Bruce Castle School. Rowland Hill was a schoolmaster at Hazelwood from 1808 to 1833, and headmaster for much of that time.

=== Colonisation of South Australia ===
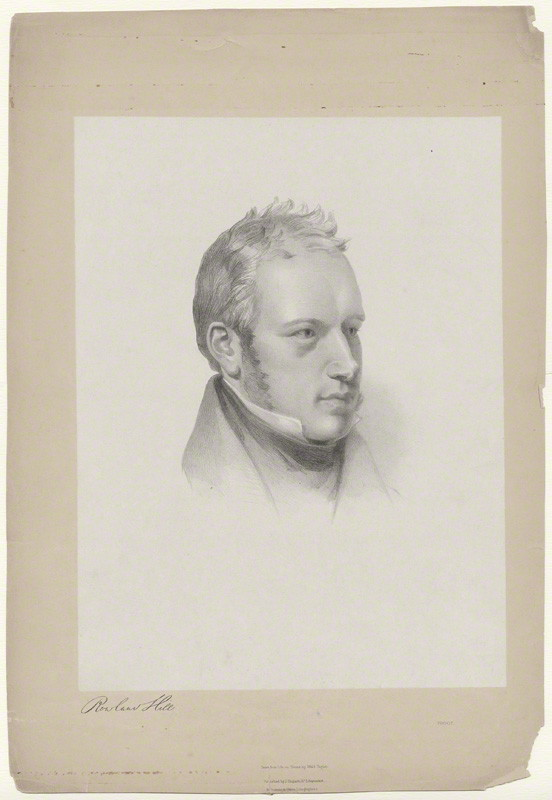
Sir Rowland Hill, mid-19th century

The colonisation of South Australia was a project of Edward Gibbon Wakefield, who believed that many of the social problems in Britain were caused by overcrowding and overpopulation. In 1832 Rowland Hill published a tract called Home colonies: sketch of a plan for the gradual extinction of pauperism, and for the diminution of crime, based on a Dutch model.

Hill then served from 1833 until 1839 as secretary of the South Australian Colonization Commission, which worked successfully to establish a settlement without convicts at what is today Adelaide. The political economist Robert Torrens was chairman of the commission. Under the South Australia Act 1834, the colony was to embody the ideals and best qualities of British society, shaped by religious freedom and a commitment to social progress and civil liberties. Hill's famous pamphlet Post Office Reform was authored during his tenure as secretary of the South Australian Colonization Commission, and there are strong parallels between Hill's economic argument for uniform pricing of postal rates and the uniform pricing of land in Wakefield’s scheme of colonization that was followed in South Australia.

Hill, like his father, was a fan of proportional representation. As a member of the Colonization Commission, Hill convinced the Commission to give Adelaide an election system that provided for minority representation. Although not STV, the system used was based on the Hare quota. This was said to be the first application of proportional representation to a public election in the world.

The Commission's annual report, written by Hill, said the novel system was to be used to "make timely provision against the arbitrary power that under popular governments the majority exercise over the minority.... [By use of the quorum], parties shall bear the same proportion to each other in the Council that they may bear in the elective body [the electorate]."

Rowland Hill's sister, Caroline Clark, her husband Francis, and their large family migrated to South Australia in 1850.

== Postal reform ==
Rowland Hill first started to take a serious interest in postal reforms in 1835. In 1836 Robert Wallace, MP, provided Hill with numerous books and documents, which Hill described as a "half hundred weight of material". Hill commenced a detailed study of these documents and this led him to publish, in early 1837, a pamphlet called Post Office Reform its Importance and Practicability. He submitted a copy of this to the Chancellor of the Exchequer, Thomas Spring Rice, on 4 January 1837. This first edition was marked "private and confidential" and was not released to the general public. The Chancellor summoned Hill to a meeting in which the Chancellor suggested improvements, asked for reconsiderations and requested a supplement, which Hill duly produced and supplied on 28 January 1837.

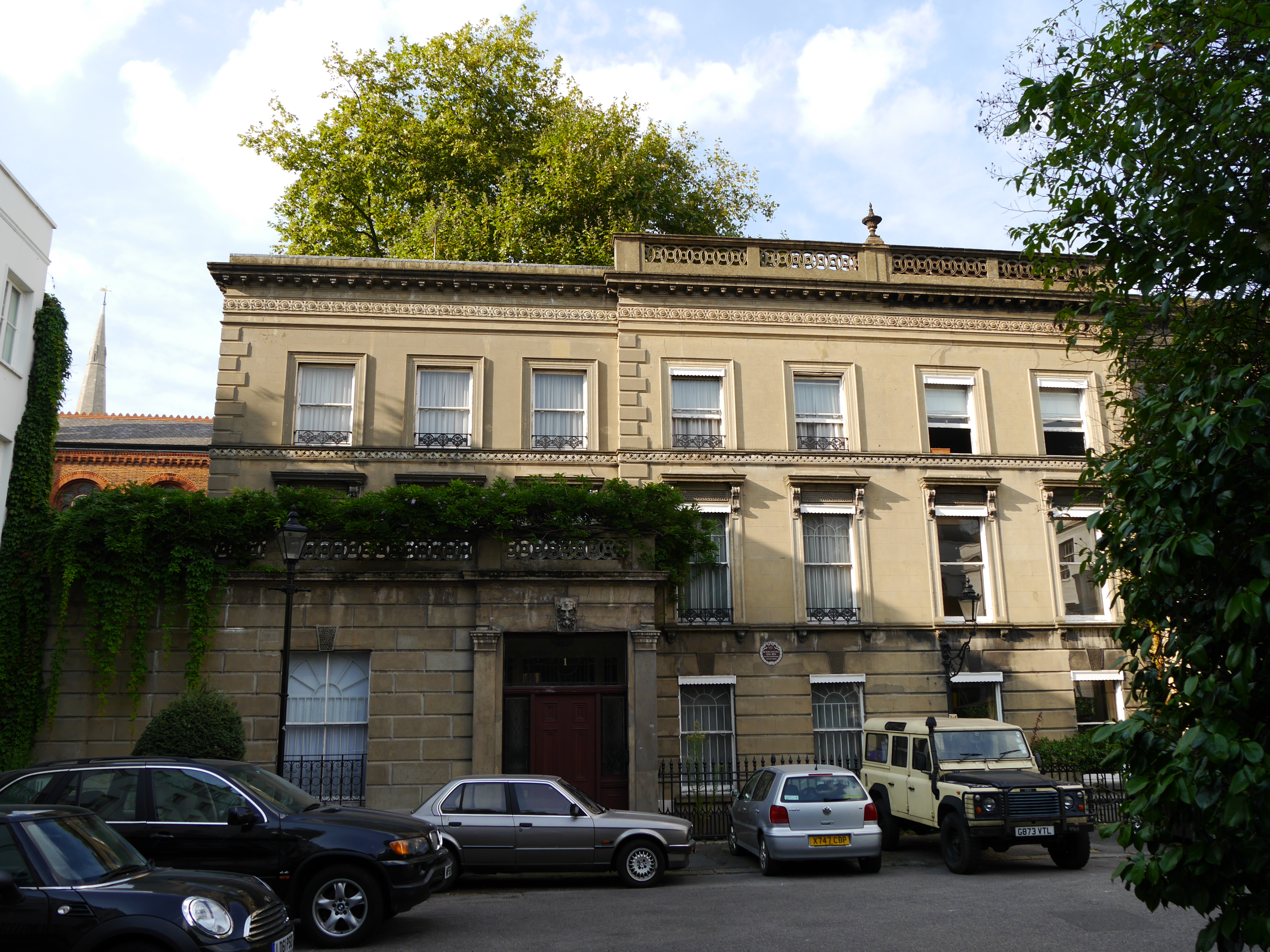
1 Orme Square, Bayswater, London, W2, Hill's home 1839–42

In the 1830s at least 12.5% of all British mail was conveyed under the personal frank of peers, dignitaries and members of parliament, while censorship and political espionage were conducted by postal officials. Fundamentally, the postal system was mismanaged, wasteful, expensive and slow. It had become inadequate for the needs of an expanding commercial and industrial nation. There is a well-known story, probably apocryphal, about how Hill gained an interest in reforming the postal system; he apparently noticed a young woman too poor to claim a letter sent to her by her fiancé. At that time, letters were normally paid for by the recipient, not the sender. The recipient could simply refuse delivery. Frauds were commonplace: for example, coded information could appear on the cover of the letter; the recipient would examine the cover to gain the information, and then refuse delivery to avoid payment. Each individual letter had to be logged. In addition, postal rates were complex, depending on the distance and the number of sheets in the letter.

Richard Cobden and John Ramsey McCulloch, both advocates of free trade, attacked the policies of privilege and protection of the Tory government. McCulloch, in 1833, advanced the view that "nothing contributes more to facilitate commerce than the safe, speedy and cheap conveyance of letters."

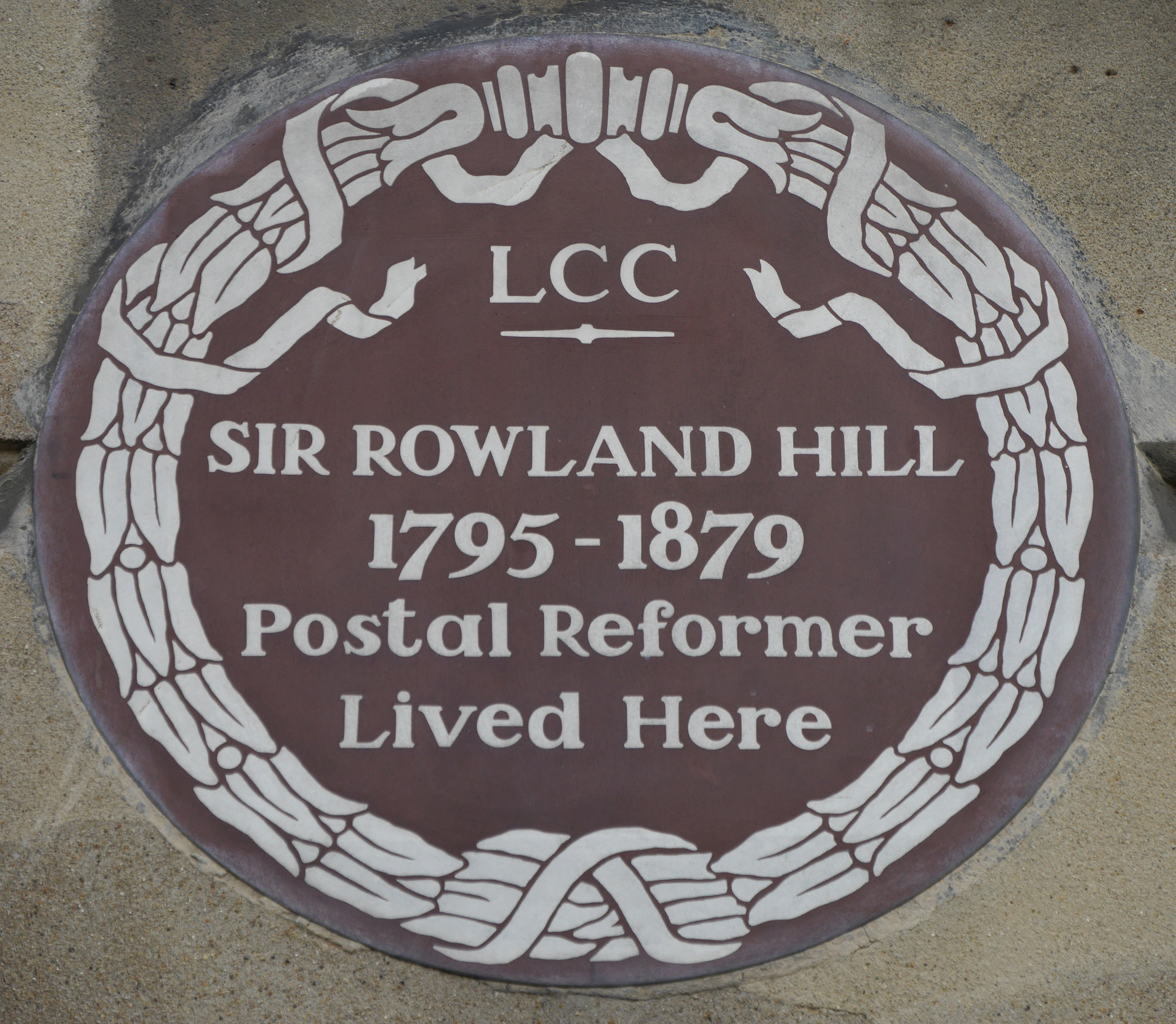
Commemorative plaque at 1 Orme Square, Bayswater, London

Hill's pamphlet, Post Office Reform: its Importance and Practicability, referred to above, was circulated privately in 1837. The report called for "low and uniform rates" according to weight, rather than distance. Hill's study reported his findings and those of Charles Babbage that most of the costs in the postal system were not for transport, but rather for laborious handling procedures at the origins and the destinations. Costs could be reduced dramatically if postage were prepaid by the sender, the prepayment to be proven by the use of prepaid letter sheets or adhesive stamps (adhesive stamps had long been used to show payment of taxes, on documents for example). Letter sheets were to be used because envelopes were not yet common; they were not yet mass-produced, and in an era when postage was calculated partly on the basis of the number of sheets of paper used, the same sheet of paper would be folded and serve for both the message and the address. In addition, Hill proposed to lower the postage rate to a penny per half ounce, without regard to distance. He first presented his proposal to the government in 1837.

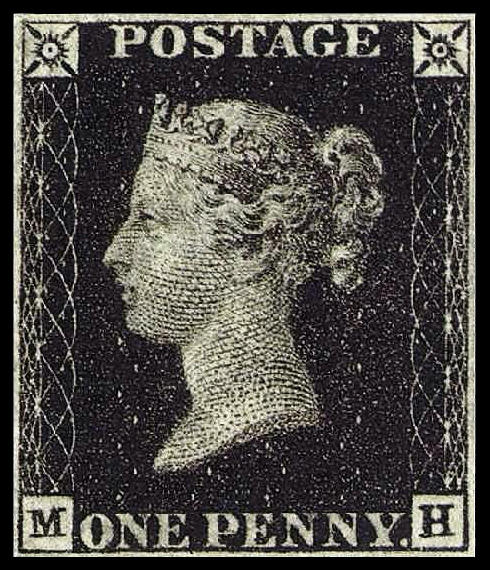
The Penny Black, the world's first adhesive postage stamp

In the House of Lords the Postmaster, Lord Lichfield, a Whig, denounced Hill's "wild and visionary schemes." William Leader Maberly, Secretary to the Post Office, also a Whig, denounced Hill's study: "This plan appears to be a preposterous one, utterly unsupported by facts and resting entirely on assumption". But merchants, traders and bankers viewed the existing system as corrupt and a restraint of trade. They formed a "Mercantile Committee" to advocate Hill's plan and push for its adoption. In 1839 Hill was given a two-year contract to run the new system.

From 1839 to 1842, Hill lived at 1 Orme Square, Bayswater, London, and there is an LCC plaque there in his honour.

The uniform fourpenny post rate lowered the cost to fourpence from 5 December 1839, then to the penny rate on 10 January 1840, even before stamps or letter sheets could be printed. The volume of paid internal correspondence increased dramatically, by 120%, between November 1839 and February 1840. This initial increase resulted from the elimination of "free franking" privileges and fraud.

Prepaid letter sheets, with a design by William Mulready, were distributed in early 1840. These Mulready envelopes were not popular and were widely satirised. According to a brochure distributed by the National Postal Museum (now the British Postal Museum & Archive), the Mulready envelopes threatened the livelihoods of stationery manufacturers, who encouraged the satires. They became so unpopular that the government used them on official mail and destroyed many others.

However, a niche commercial publishing industry for machine-printed illustrated envelopes subsequently developed in Britain and elsewhere. So it is likely that it was the grandiose and incomprehensible illustration printed on the envelopes that provoked the ridicule and led to their withdrawal. Indeed, in the absence of examples of machine-printed illustrated envelopes before this, the Mulready envelope may be recognised as a significant innovation in its own right. Machine-printed illustrated envelopes are a mainstay of the direct mail industry.

In May 1840 the world's first adhesive postage stamps were distributed. With an elegant engraving of the young Queen Victoria (whose 21st birthday was celebrated that month), the Penny Black was an instant success. Refinements, such as perforations to ease the separation of the stamps, were instituted with later issues.

== Later life ==
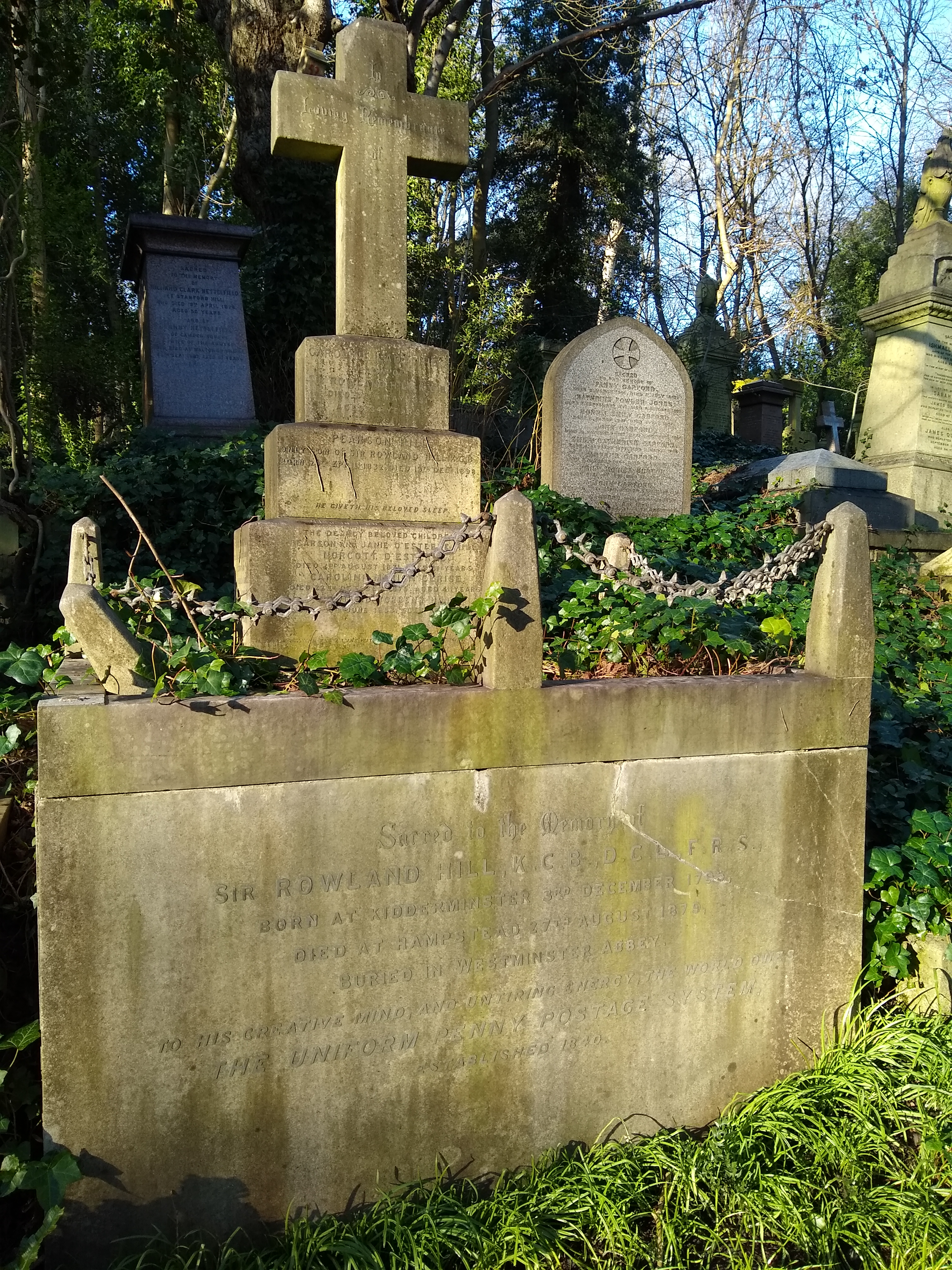
Hill famlly vault at Highgate Cemetery, London

Rowland Hill continued at the Post Office until the Conservative Party won the 1841 General Election. Sir Robert Peel returned to office on 30 August 1841 and served until 29 June 1846. Amid rancorous controversy, Hill was dismissed in July 1842. However, the London and Brighton Railway named him a director and later chairman of the board, from 1843 to 1846. He lowered the fares from London to Brighton, expanded the routes, offered special excursion trains, and made the commute comfortable for passengers. In 1844 Edwin Chadwick, Rowland Hill, John Stuart Mill, Lyon Playfair, Dr. Neil Arnott, and other friends formed a society called "Friends in Council," which met at each other's houses to discuss questions of political economy. Hill also became a member of the influential Political Economy Club, founded by David Ricardo and other classical economists, but now including many powerful businessmen and political figures. Mill and Hill were both advocates of proportional representation.

In 1846, the Conservative Party split over the repeal of the Corn Laws and was replaced by a Whig government led by Lord John Russell. Hill was made Secretary to the Postmaster General, and then Secretary to the Post Office from 1854 until 1864. For his services, Hill was knighted as a Knight Commander of the Order of the Bath in 1860. He was made a Fellow of the Royal Society and awarded an honorary degree from University of Oxford.

For the last 30 years of his life Hill lived at Bartram House on Hampstead Green. Bartram House was the largest house in a row of four Georgian mansions which were demolished at the start of the twentieth century to make way for Hampstead General Hospital, which was itself demolished in the 1970s and replaced by The Royal Free Hospital. For twenty years his next-door neighbour on Hampstead Green was the Gothic revival architect Samuel Sanders Teulon, who designed St Stephen's Church, Rosslyn Hill, facing their houses.

Hill was still living at Bartram House when he died in 1879. He is buried in Westminster Abbey; there is a memorial to him on his family grave in Highgate Cemetery. There are streets named after him in Hampstead (off Haverstock Hill, down the side of the Royal Free Hospital) and Tottenham (off White Hart Lane). A Royal Society of Arts blue plaque, unveiled in 1893, commemorates Hill at the Royal Free Hospital in Hampstead.

== Family ==
Hill was one of eight children. Several of his siblings also achieved fame:

- Matthew Davenport Hill (1792–1872), was Recorder of Birmingham, a campaigner on prison reform, and, from 1832, MP for Hull.
- Edwin Hill (1793–1876), who was the first British Controller of Stamps from 1840 until 1872, and invented a mechanical system to make envelopes.
- Frederic Hill (1803–1896) was a prison reformer.

== Legacy and commemorations ==
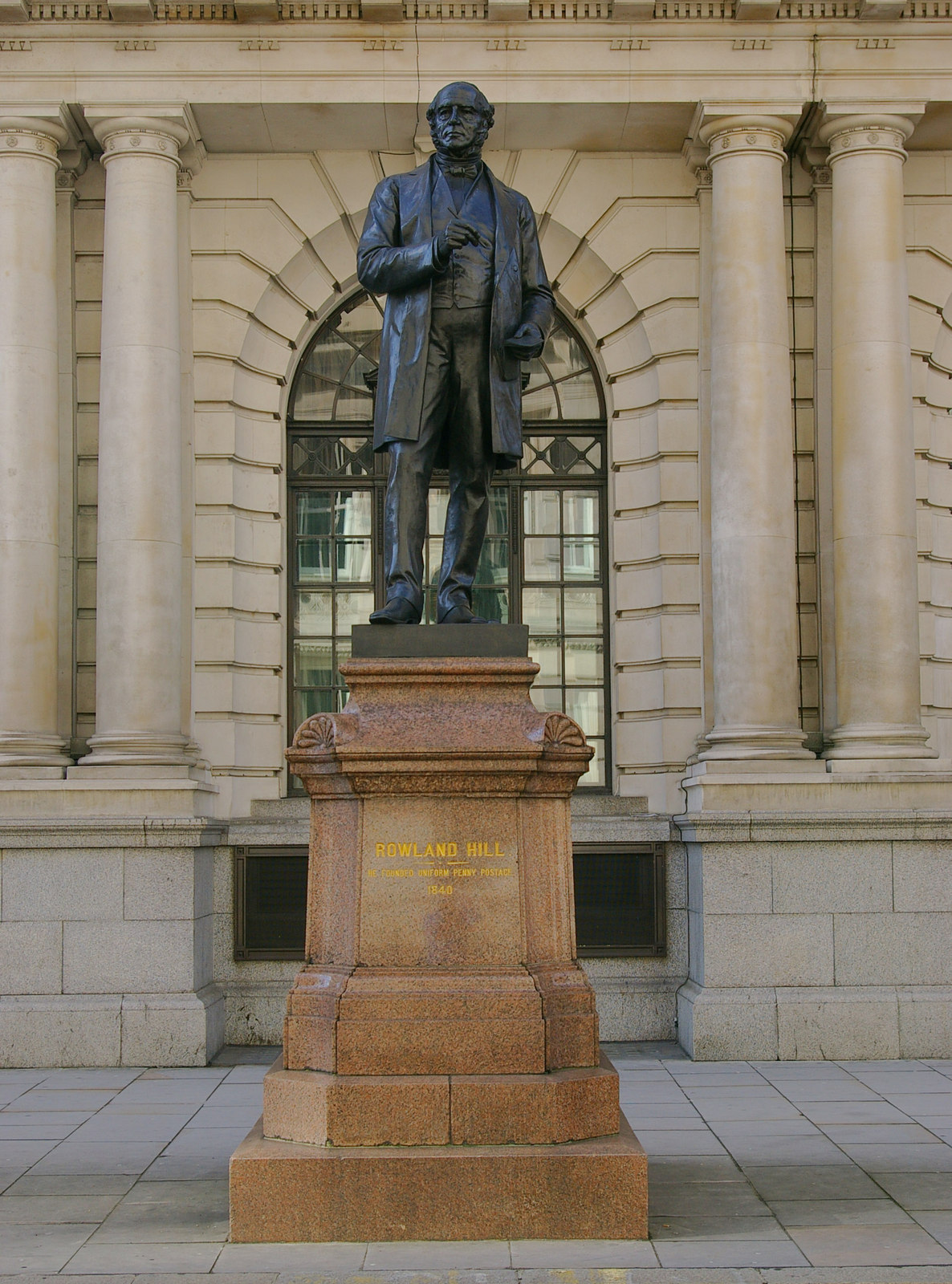
Statue of Rowland Hill by Edward Onslow Ford, 1884, at King Edward Street, London

Hill has two legacies. The first was his model for the education of the emerging middle classes. The second was his model for an efficient postal system to serve businesses and the public, including the postage stamp and the system of low and uniform postal rates, which is often taken for granted in the modern world. In this, he not only changed postal services around the world, but also made commerce more efficient and profitable, even though it took 30 years before the British Post Office's revenue recovered to its 1839 level. The Uniform Penny Post continued in the UK into the 20th century, and at one point, one penny (1d) paid for up to four ounces (113 g).

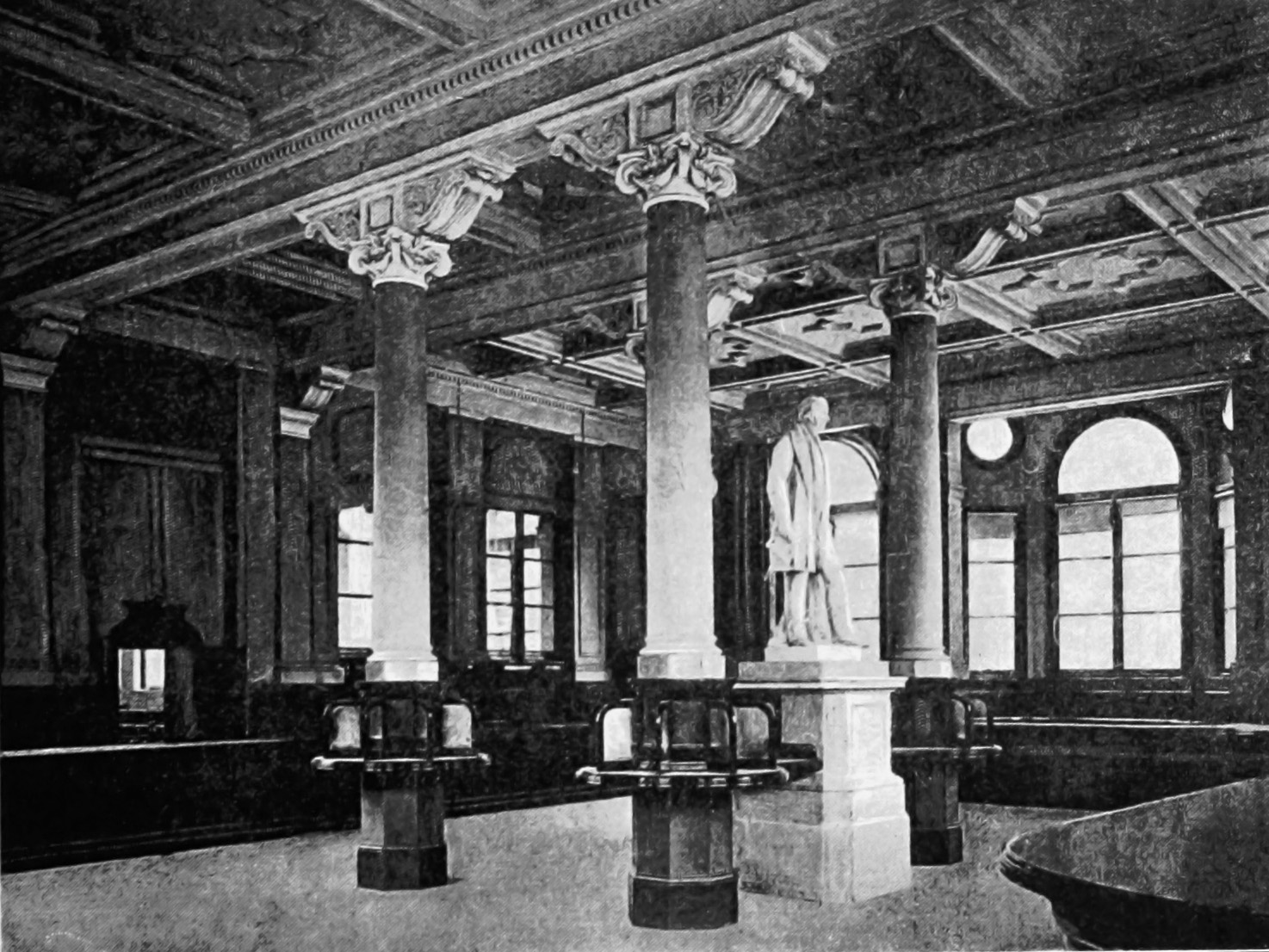
The Birmingham statue in the city's General Post Office, circa 1894, shortly after its opening

There are four public statues of Hill. The earliest is in Birmingham: a Carrara marble sculpture by Peter Hollins unveiled in 1870. Its location was moved in 1874, 1891 (when it was placed in the city's General Post Office) and 1934. In 1940 it was removed for safekeeping for the duration of the Second World War. It is now in the foyer of the Royal Mail sorting office in Newtown, Birmingham.

A marble statue in Kidderminster, Hill's birthplace, was sculpted by Sir Thomas Brock and unveiled in June 1881. It is at the junction of Vicar and Exchange Streets. Hill is prominent in Kidderminster's community history. There used to be a J D Wetherspoon pub called The Penny Black in the town centre until 2019 and a large shopping mall linking Vicar Street and Worcester Street is named The Rowland Hill Shopping Centre.

In London a bronze statue by Edward Onslow Ford, also made in 1881, stands outside the King Edward Building (formerly London's principal Post Office) in King Edward Street. There is a large sculpture in Dalton Square, Lancaster, The Victoria Monument, depicting eminent Victorians and Rowland Hill is included.

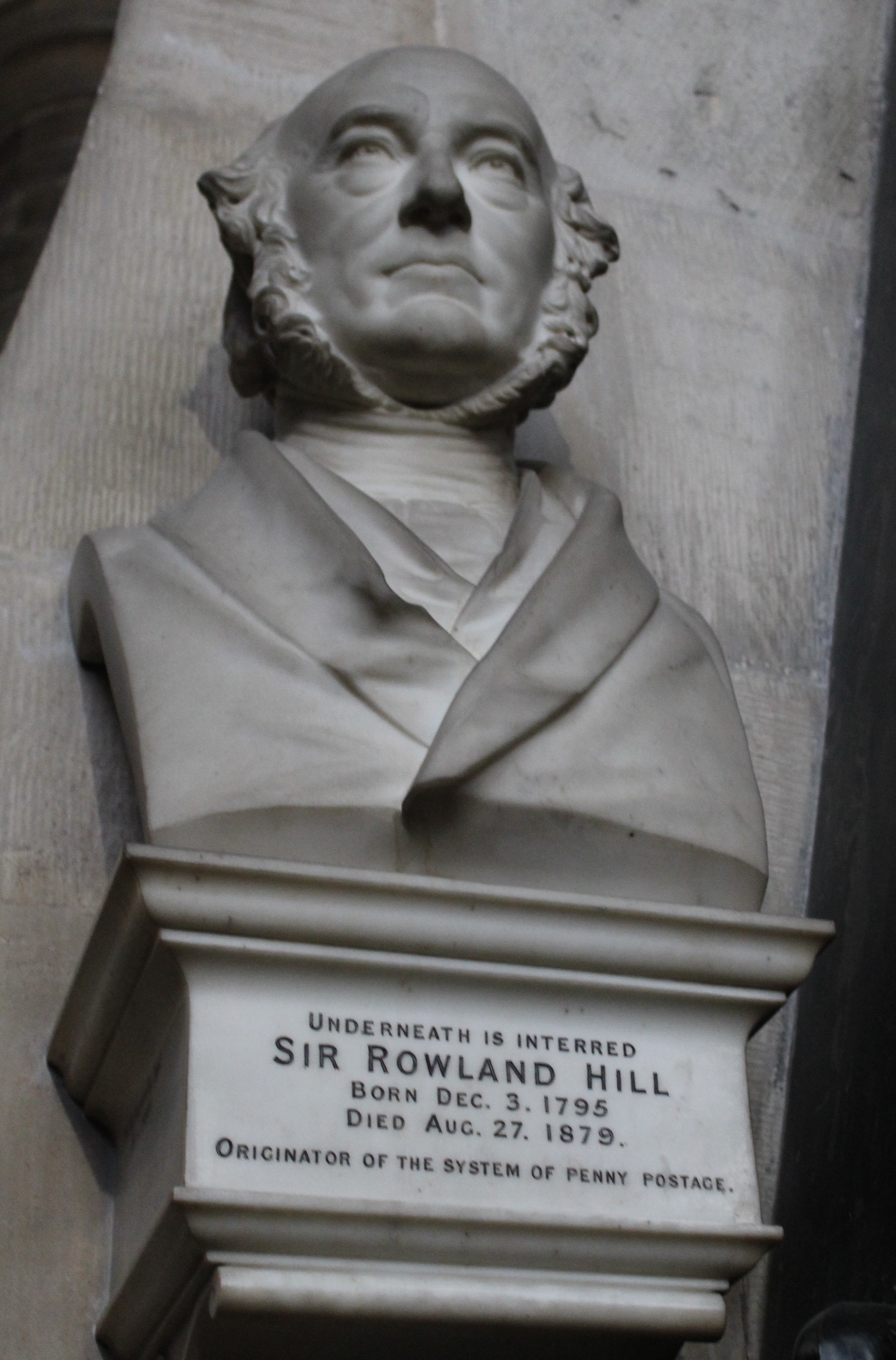
Bust of Rowland Hill marking his burial place in Westminster Abbey.

There are at least two marble busts of Hill, also unveiled in 1881. One, by W. D. Keyworth, Jr., is in St Paul's Chapel, Westminster Abbey. Another, by William Theed, is in Albert Square, Manchester.

In recognition of his contributions to the development of the modern postal system, Rowland Hill is commemorated at the Universal Postal Union, the UN agency charged with regulating the international postal system. His name appears on one of the two large meeting halls at the UPU headquarters in Bern, Switzerland.

At Tottenham, north London, there is now a local history museum at Bruce Castle (where Hill lived during the 1840s) including some relevant exhibits.

In Adelaide, the capital of South Australia, both Hill Street, North Adelaide and Rowland Place in the city centre are named in his honour.

The Rowland Hill Awards, started by the Royal Mail and the British Philatelic Trust in 1997, are annual awards for philatelic "innovation, initiative and enterprise."

In 1882 the Post Office instituted the Rowland Hill Fund for postal workers, pensioners and dependents in need. The Rowland Hill Memorial Fund of Ireland was founded for Ireland in 1928, to help serving or retired staff and their dependents, for the former Department of Posts and Telegraphs and continues to serve the reorganised companies An Post and eircom. The fund assists more than 300 people annually.

=== Philatelic commemorations ===
For the centenary of the first stamp, Portugal issued a miniature sheet with 8 stamps mentioning his name. Later, on his death centenary, an omnibus issue of stamps commemorating Hill was produced by about 80 countries. Altogether, 147 countries have issued stamps commemorating him.

== See also ==
- Penny Blue
