= Herbert Edward Powell =

Australian painter and photolithographer (1871–1940)

Herbert Edward Powell (19 July? 1871 – 31 August 1940), commonly referred to as H. E. Powell, was a painter and photolithographer in Adelaide, South Australia. He was an important member of the South Australian Society of Arts.

== History ==
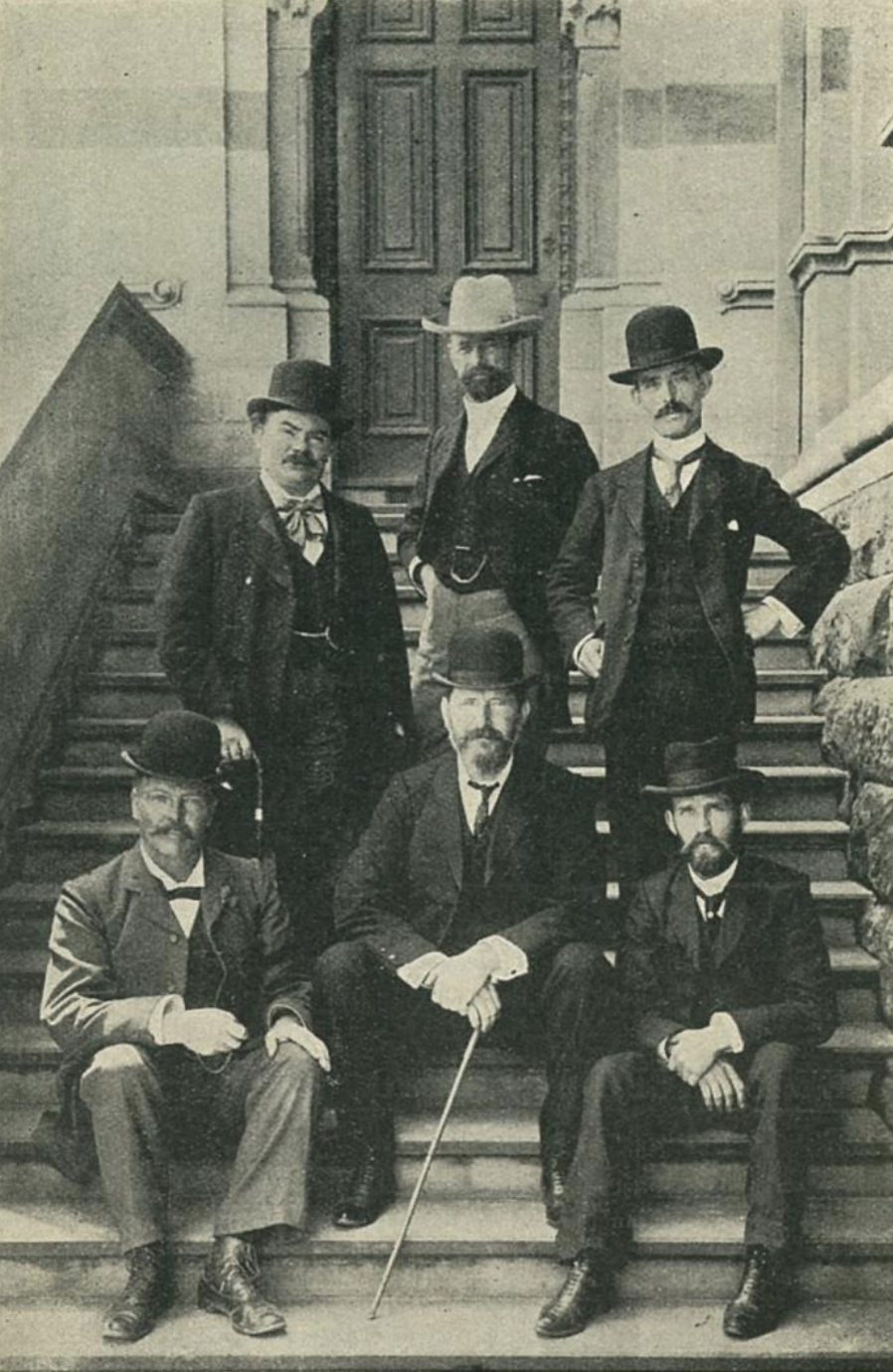
South Australian Society of Arts Selection and Hanging Committee 1902: Mr Harry P Gill (Chairman), Messrs J. White, J Ashton, Edward Davies, J Keene and H.E. Powell (Hon.Sec)

Powell was born in Adelaide, son of baker William Powell, for whom Powell's Corner, Kent Town, was named.

He was a student at the School of Design 1887–1900 under H. P. Gill, gaining several diplomas from the South Kensington Art School.

He joined the Public Service in 1887, and worked in the Government photolithography department under Alfred Vaughan until succeeding him as Government photolithographer in 1921. The photolithographic department was responsible for production of much of the South Australian photographic resources used by the Education Department, Tourist Bureau and other departments.

He was a member of Gill's exclusive but short-lived Adelaide Art Circle, which folded in 1892 when many of its members joined the moribund South Australian Society of Arts in order to bring it back to life. Three of its members (Gill, W. K. Gold and Powell) were elected president, secretary and treasurer respectively. The new committee consisted of A. Scott Broad, M. F. Cavanagh, J. Keane, G. A. Reynolds, W. J. Wadham.

He was one of those responsible in 1898 for initiating the annual Federal Exhibition of Australian Art, through which many paintings were acquired for the National Gallery's Australia Room, through the Elder Bequest. Powell was a member of its Selection and Hanging Committee almost every year until 1921.

Powell was a member of the St. Andrew's Lodge of Freemasons, and a prominent lawn bowls player.

== Family ==
Powell married Adelaide Mary Malin on 16 December 1903. She died on 23 April 1913. He then married Hilda Cordelia Boyce (died 1960) of Semaphore on 17 February 1916. They had a home at 61 First Avenue, Sefton Park, South Australia.

Frederick Charles Powell (c. 1859–1924), advertising agent, and father of Ivy Powell, who married Harold Smyrk, was a brother.
