= William Joseph Wadham and Alfred Sinclair Wadham =

English painter

Brothers William Joseph Wadham (1863–1950) and Alfred Sinclair Wadham (1866–1938) were English painters in watercolors who were active in Australia in the late 19th century. The younger brother invariably used the name Alfred Sinclair.

== History ==
Wadham and Sinclair were sons of Benjamin Brassett (or Braffat) Wadham (1816–1904), a painter of some note who was deaf and dumb from birth. Joseph learnt to paint at his father's side, and accompanied him on his many sketching trips throughout England and Wales, and had the privilege of seeing many of England's premier artists at work. Joseph had his first picture accepted for exhibition by the Walker Art Gallery, Liverpool, at age 14. In 1885 he left for Australia.

Alfred studied at the Liverpool Academy of Arts and left for Melbourne, Australia, in 1887, to join his brother, who had made the journey a year earlier. After a brief stay they moved to Adelaide, and joined the South Australian Society of Arts. They had exhibitions in Melbourne in 1889 and 1895, which were favourably and extensively reviewed.

They set up a gallery "Wadham & Sinclair's Fine Art Institute" on Grenfell Street where they showed their works and ran art classes. They made an extended visit to Mount Gambier in mid-1888. In 1891 they moved their studio to Mutual Chambers, King William Street, and had several art classes running.

In 1892 they were elected to the Adelaide Art Circle, whose president was H. P. Gill, and the South Australian Society of Arts, but were among those (like G. A. Reynolds and A. Scott Broad) who later in the year resigned to form the Adelaide Easel Club, with Joseph its first president.

They had a sketching holiday in New Zealand in 1896, and on their return moved their studio to new premises in the Widows Funds Building, Grenfell Street. Joseph Wadham took an exhibition to Perth in 1896 and 1897, touring the goldfields and making further sketches. A major exhibition in 1897, opened by the Governor, featured several paintings of Kalgoorlie and Perth; among the works shown was a joint effort – Precipice Gorge, New Zealand, painted in oils. Shortly after this exhibition, Alfred returned to England.

Joseph stayed longer in Australia, married and had several children, but he had great ambitions, and made several trips to South Africa, Canada and New Zealand painting, exhibiting and organising exhibitors for an exhibition of Dominion art in 1897, which was attended by the Prince of Wales, and 1898. He helped found the Royal British Colonial Society of Artists, which had a successful exhibition in 1902.

In the early 1920s Wadham opened the Wadham Art Gallery in Sydney, which carried works by a large number of artists, the best-known being Sir John Millais, as well as himself. He sold up and returned to England in 1923.

Works by Wadham and Sinclair have been held by the Art Gallery of South Australia and the Art Gallery of Western Australia.

== Some works ==
Benjamin Brassett Wadham

"Your Paintings". Art UK.

W. J. Wadham

- Michael Richards. "Australian Politicians, c. 1887". Museum of Australian Democracy.
- "William Joseph Wadham (British, 1863–1950)". artnet auction results.
- "William Joseph Wadham (1863–1950)". Ask ART-The Artists' Bluebook.
- "William Joseph Wadham Auction Price Results". Invaluable – The world's premier auctions.

A. Sinclair

- "Alfred Wadham Sinclair (1866-1938)". Invaluable – The world's premier auctions.
- "Alfred Wadham Sinclair (1866–1938)". Ask ART-The Artists' Bluebook.

== Family ==
William Joseph Wadham
"Mr. Wadham was 18 when he came out to South Australia to settle, and, as it proved, to marry and gather around him a little family. But there were sad years to come! He has lost all those who were dear to him with the exception of this fine lad ..."

He married Josephine Yates née Smith (1865-) at Rooty Hill near Sydney on 4 Dec 1889. He married Fanny Sophia Kate Griffiths ( – ca.14 August 1920) in Victoria in 1915. More detail is not readily available.

Alfred Sinclair Wadham

He married Lucy Strapps of Adelaide on 1 November 1893. She was one of his art students; died 9 February 1907 in Fairbourne, North Wales.

They had another brother, Benjamin Thomas Wadham, who was also a painter.
