= Whinnen =

Whinnen is a surname. Notable people with the surname include:

- George Whinnen (1891–1950), Australian painter
- Mel Whinnen (born 1942), Australian footballer
