= Duncan Goldfinch =

Australian painter (1888–1960)

Duncan Alexander Macarthur Goldfinch (20 September 1888 – 1960) was a South Australian painter, noted for his watercolours of Central Australia.

== History ==
Duncan was born in the Sydney suburb of St Marys the eldest son of Elizabeth M. Goldfinch, née King (1867–1933) and her husband Henry Edward Goldfinch (ca.1854 – 7 June 1939), a retired Royal Navy officer. Elizabeth was born at Elizabeth Farm a granddaughter of both Governor King and Hannibal H. Macarthur.

He joined Dalgety & Co at age 16 as a junior clerk, and became a salesman for their Ford division. He married in 1911; they lived at Rose Bay and first moved to Adelaide in 1933, but for some years alternated between Rose Bay and Medindie or (later) North Adelaide.

He was a keen amateur painter in watercolours. He joined the Royal South Australian Society of Arts and had his first showing, of four watercolours, at a Society exhibition in 1941, and his first one-man show in 1948.

He made a painting expedition to Hermannsburg with John Goodchild in 1950, and followed this with an expedition to Uluru (then named Ayers Rock) in 1951; he was the first European artist to paint "The Rock" and the Kata Tjuta (then named Mount Olga). He was accompanied by Con Doecke of Strathalbyn, Dick Woods of Mount Crawford, Noel Bantick of Adelaide, Keith Heggarty of Melbourne, and Dr. Ian Darian Smith. The fruits of his expedition when made public the following year, were well received.

He succeeded George Whinnen as president of the Royal South Australian Society of Arts 1950–1953.

His Spirit of Sydney was a finalist for the Wynne Prize in 1957.

== Other activities ==
He was a keen golfer, with the unusual technique (for a right-hander) of putting left-handed.

== Family ==
Duncan married Mary Medora Cowper on 7 March 1911; they had one son, Malcolm (born 6 June 1916)

== Bibliography ==
- Schrapel, Stephanie Duncan Goldfinch Royal South Australian Society of Arts 1993 ISBN 0646150006
