= Thomas Grigg =

Thomas Grigg may refer to:

- Thomas Grigg (politician) (1889–1969) in Victoria, Australia
- Thomas Grigg (musician) (1859–1944), South Australian teacher of violin
