= Charles Cawthorne =

Australian musician and music businessman (1854–1925)

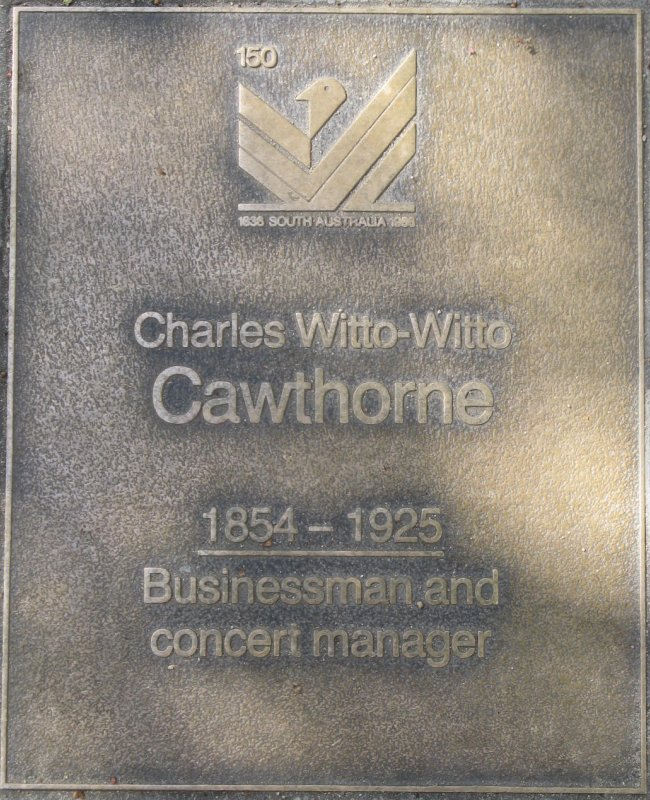

Charles Witto-witto Cawthorne (1 July 1854 – 26 June 1925) was a businessman who, with his father founded Cawthorne and Co, music publishers and retailers in Adelaide, South Australia. He was a proficient musician and important in the history of orchestral music of Adelaide.

== History ==
Charles Cawthorne was born in Adelaide the second son of W. A. Cawthorne and educated by his parents – his father was a noted schoolmaster and his mother a talented pianist. He studied violin under F. Draeger and piano under Gustav Louis Esselbach (died 2 June 1885) and as an adult, music was his great interest, both as a performer and as a promoter and organiser. He was co-founder with his father of Cawthorne & Co. as a business involved in every aspect of music-making, and chairman of directors of Cawthorne's Limited, a family company formed to take over the business.

He was also active in non-professional organisations such as the Adelaide Choral Society, Elder Conservatorium students' concerts, the South Australian State Orchestra, and Minda Home. At the age of 18, he was made conductor of the Adelaide Amateur Orchestra. He and W. C. Chapman formed the nucleus of orchestras for major social events at Government House and the Town Hall, and founded the Adelaide Orchestra, which became (Hermann) Heinicke's Grand Orchestra. He founded the Conservatorium Grand Orchestra which became the Adelaide Grand Orchestra. In 1910 he founded the Adelaide Orchestral Society. In each of these he played bassoon and occasionally conducted. He also had some success as a composer of waltzes.

He did much to promote local talent – he was prominent in raising funds to enable violinist W. L. Harris, pianist John Bishop and singer Helene Taylor to study overseas. During the Great War he was prominent in patriotic fund-raising activities: during 1915 he organised no fewer than 60 concerts featuring such musicians as the Adelaide Bach Society, Adelaide Choral Society, Adelaide Orpheus Society and soloists Delmar Hall, Brewster-Jones, and Thomas Grigg.

He organised concerts starring the great soloists of the day – Madame Albani, Amy Castles, Peter Dawson, Clara Serena, and Hilda Felstead.

Three of his four sons, Gus (1887–1937), Cyril (1894–1971) and Frank (1899–1985), had a continuing involvement with the company. See main article for family details.

== works ==
- 1883 Olivia Waltz
- 1887 Dorothea Waltz
- 1904 Greta Waltz
- 1900 Adelaide Jubilee Exhibition Polka
- AYMS (Adelaide Young Men's Society Waltz

== Recognition ==
He has been recognised by:

- a plaque on the Jubilee 150 Walkway
- A newspaper nominated him one of the 15 notable SA musicians of the late 19th and early 20th century: Frederick Bevan, Charles Cawthorne, E. Harold Davies, J. M. Dunn, Thomas Grigg, Hermann Heinicke, John Horner, E. H. Wallace Packer, Harold S. Parsons, W. R. Pybus, I. G. Reimann, William Silver, C. J. Stevens, Oscar Taeuber, Arthur Williamson

== See also ==
- List of Australian composers
