= William Wadham =

William Wadham may refer to:

- William Wadham (Australian politician), politician in the colony of South Australia
- Sir William Wadham (died 1452), High Sheriff of Devon, 1441–1442
- William Joseph Wadham, English watercolour painter, active in Australia
