= E. F. Troy =

Australian stained glass artist and decorative painter

Edward Francis Troy (30 January 1856 – 7 April 1910) was a stained glass artist and decorative painter in Adelaide, South Australia, and a founder, in 1884, of the St Vincent de Paul Society in that State.

== History ==
Troy had a studio and workshop at 67 Flinders Street and another at Gawler Place, where he and a small staff produced much of the art glass found in the villas of affluent Adelaide in the late 19th and early 20th century. He is believed to have engaged artists to fulfil large contracts as they arose. Two of his employees are known:

- R. Elliott, a Scotsman, designed the northern windows for the School of Mines' Brookman Hall on North Terrace. Dubbed the Empire Window and featuring Edward VII and Queen Alexandra, they were installed in 1902. He was also responsible for the Coronation Window in the council chamber, Adelaide Town Hall, presented by A. M. Simpson. The centre window has been attributed to Troy himself.
- Herbert Moesbury Smyrk (1862–1947), born in Guildford, Surrey, and emigrated to Melbourne, where he entered into a partnership with one Charles Rogers as Smyrk & Rogers, stained glass artists, dissolved in September 1888. Smyrk then moved to Adelaide, where he was active in the Adelaide Easel Club and responsible for some of Adelaide's finest locally-produced glass art. Smyrk left for London around March 1898, but a year later his imminent return to Australia was reported. He was a world traveller with a special fondness for Tahiti. In later years he used "Herbert Moesbury" as his full name. His known works include:

- Two windows for St Ignatius' church in Norwood,
- The west windows in the Congregational Church at Keyneton, in memory of Henry Evans and Mrs. S. Lindsay Evans, donated by her brother J. H. Angas, were attributed to Troy, while those in the porch came from the studio of H. L. Vosz.
- Fruits of the Earth for the original St Augustine's (Anglican) Church, Unley.
- The east window for St George's (Anglican) church in Gawler.
The swimmer and Olympic high-diver Harold Nelson Smyrk was his son.

See also H. L. Vosz,

== Other interests ==
- Troy was a member of the St. Francis Xavier's branch of the Hibernian Society
- As Bro. Troy he was a member of the Adelaide conference of the Society of Saint Vincent de Paul, and active in its outreach program to teach the Catechism to Catholic boys at the Magill Reformatory and the hulk Fitzjames at Port Adelaide.
- He was in 1903 the foundation president of the Particular Council, a position he held until 1908, when he was presented with a gold medal in recognition of his services.

== Family ==
Troy married Emma Jane Ifould Keetley (1857 – 3 January 1910). Their family included:

- Edward Matthew Troy (c. 1883 – 1935) married Elsie Ruby Tague ?? in 1914
- William John Troy (1885 – 4 August 1916) with 27 Battalion, killed in action, France. In his will he left his share of Gawler Place house to sister Alice; all other assets including army pay and pension, to his girlfriend of three years, Tasma Fletcher; His sister Alice opened legal proceedings to invalidate the will.
- Vincent Augustine Troy (15 June 1887 – 16 April 1940) married Wendouree Rose Giles on 6 June 1911
- Bernard Troy (c. 1889 – 30 May 1938) married Lidy Gladys ??
- Mary Cecilia "Ciss" Troy (c. 1891 – 27 June 1935) married Gattorna
- Alice May Troy (c. 1896 – 29 July 1924) married Walter Goldie Jenkins in 1924

He died after a brief illness at home, 105 Gawler Place, Adelaide.
