= William James Maxwell =

William James Maxwell (ca.1843 – 20 July 1903) was a sculptor born in Scotland who produced several important works in Australia.

== History ==
Maxwell was the son of builder Francis Maxwell and his wife Jane Young Maxwell in Largs, Ayrshire, Scotland, where he received an education. After fifteen years living in Glasgow and London he emigrated to Australia, arriving in Melbourne in 1875, and subsequently to Adelaide, South Australia. He returned to England, expecting to re-settle there but, finding the weather oppressive, returned to Adelaide around 1890.

Maxwell was a member of H. P. Gill's exclusive but short-lived Adelaide Art Circle 1891–1892. He must have had some talents as an entertainer, as most meetings ended with him giving some kind of rendition.

He had a home at Kent Town for some time, then built a magnificent residence, "Woodlands", Edwardstown, where he died.

== Selected works ==
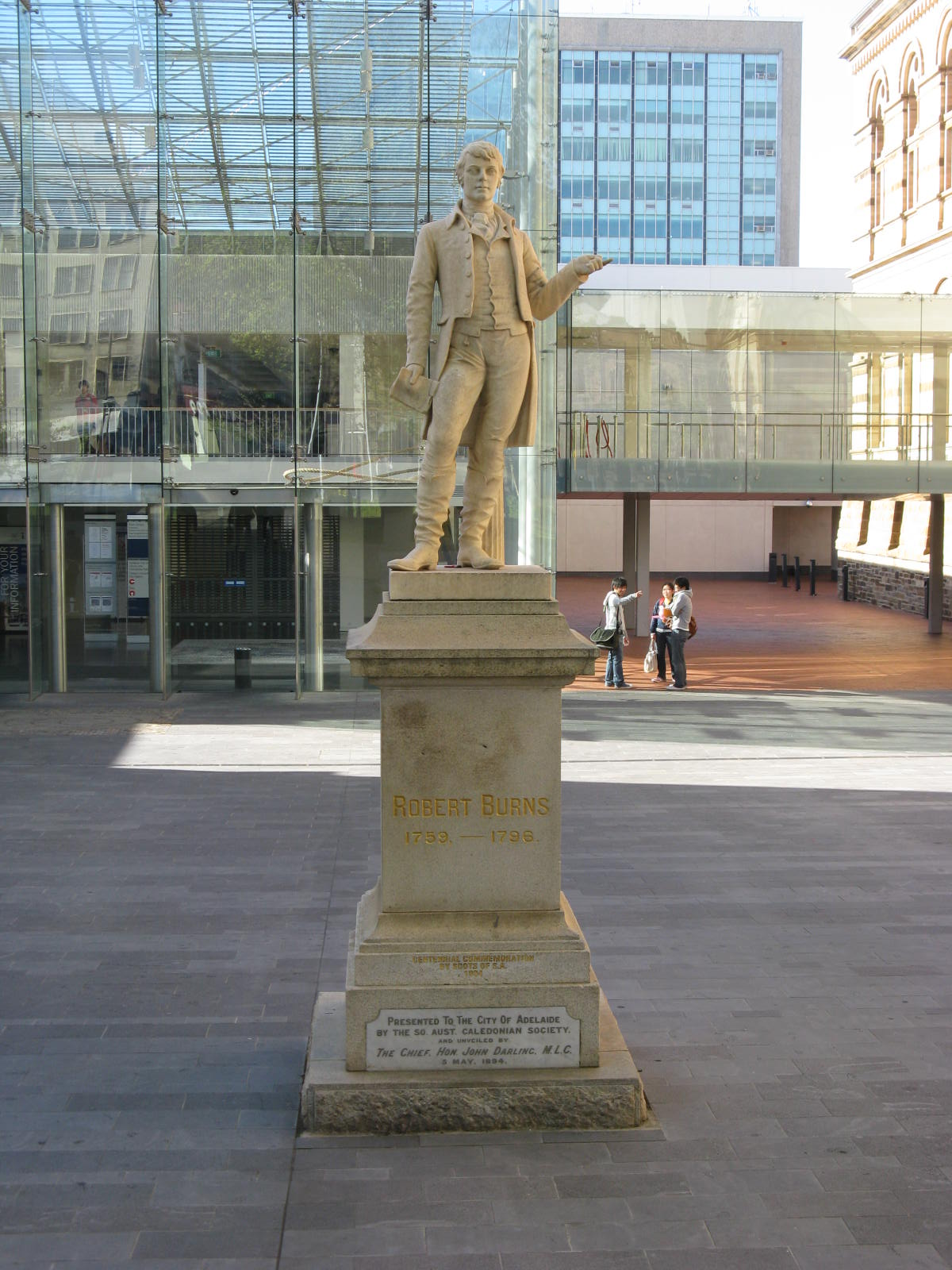
Robert Burns. The first statue carved in Adelaide.

- 1883 panel and other work for Clayton Congregational Church, Kensington, South Australia.
- 1884 statue of St. Patrick, altars, font and other work for St Mary's Cathedral, Sydney.
- 1894 statue of Robert Burns on North Terrace, Adelaide.
- "Industry" on the Savings Bank Building in Currie Street, Adelaide.
- Half-size model for a statue of John McDouall Stuart, which may have influenced James White in his work, unveiled in 1901. He was to have produced the full-size statue, but died before the marble ordered from London arrived.
- (unspecified) work for the new Parliament buildings and Bank of South Australia, Australian Mutual and E.,S.,& A. Bank, and in Melbourne the E.& S. Bank and Post Office.

== Family ==
He married Isabella Strachan (1844? 1845? – 28 February 1914); their children included:

- Francis William Maxwell (1869–1947) married Edith Alice Humphris of Yongala, South Australia, on 21 April 1897. He was Assistant Engineer of Railways in Western Australia.
- John Strachan Maxwell (draftsman in the South Australian Railways) married Amy Coveny of Sydney on 2 March 1908
- William Maxwell (1882–1951) lived in Western Australia.
- Margaret Innes "Ina" Maxwell (1870–1962) married Charles Henry Reeves on 28 September 1888, lived at Mount Barker.
- Jane Young "Janie" Maxwell (1873–1963) married Christopher H. Ragless on 15 October 1897, lived on South Road.
- Susan "Susie" Maxwell (4 February 1885 – 1967) married Leslie H. H. Shepley, lived in Kadina, South Australia
- Helen Maxwell (6 February 1887 – 1964) married Leslie Hall Wright on 6 June 1914
- Isabella Maxwell (6 February 1887 – 1978) twin sister

They had a home at College Road, Kent Town, then "Woodlands", in Edwardstown, South Australia. He had a sister, Mrs. George Finnister of Adelaide.
