= Royal South Australian Society of Arts =

South Australian Arts society

Coordinates: 34.9208°S 138.6021°E

The Royal South Australian Society of Arts (RSASA), founded as the South Australian Society of Arts (SASA), is a society for artists in South Australia. The society was founded in the early days of the colony of South Australia, in 1856. Its gallery, built in 1906 for the society, is in Level 1 of the Institute Building, on the corner North Terrace and Kintore Avenue in Adelaide. Renamed with a royal warrant in 1935, the society is Australia's oldest continuously running art society. It runs a programme of exhibition and art awards throughout the year.

== History ==
=== Formation and early years ===
A meeting of people interested in the formation of a society for the promotion of the fine arts was held on Monday evening 13 October 1856 at the Adelaide School of Arts, in Pulteney Street, at the home of Charles Hill. Owing to bad weather, few people turned up. James Macgeorge took the chair. Letters were read from J. H. Fisher, M.L.C., S. Tomkinson, J. Howard Clark, C. A. Wilson, expressing regret at being unable to attend, but expressing approval of the objects sought to be attained by that meeting. The following resolutions were passed unanimously:—

That a Society, to be called the South Australian Society of Arts, be now formed, 'The annual payment of one guinea shall entitle the subscriber to all the benefits of membership, consisting in free admission to all lectures, meetings, and exhibitions of the Society. 'A donation of painting, sculpture, or other such grant of not less value than £10 sterling, or of £10 in money, shall entitle the donor to all the advantages of membership for life; the Society reserving the right to decline any unsuitable object. 'The Society to be governed by a President, two Vice- Presidents, and a Committee of 10 members, to be elected by the Society annually. 'This meeting requests Mr Hill to secure promises of membership, and to convene a meeting of the members for arranging the operations of the Society as soon as 50 names are enrolled.' The meeting then adjourned until the time appointed by the prior resolution.

'That His Excellency Sir Richard Graves MacDonnell be requested to be the first Patron of the Society.'

'That the Committee take the necessary steps to have the Society incorporated into the South Australian Institute.'

We give publicity to this series of proposals, with a view of forwarding the interests of the new Society, by affording an opportunity to parsons favorable to its progress of considering and expressing their views regarding the contemplated arrangements. We do not, of course, suppose that with the materials at present in the colony any very rapid strides could be made in the development of works of art of any high pretensions. But the taste for the fine arts which exists without doubt among our community might be cultivated to a point that would give South Australia no mean position in this hemisphere.

We have no doubt that this Society, if successful, will ultimately include a School of Design, and the exhibition of improvements in colonial manufactures. Under the proposed rules of the Society it will be perceived that the promoters already contemplate the exhibition of works of art, either 'pictorial, ornamental, or useful,' and in this they partially carry out the views we would express. It would be necessary to make the laws of the Institution on such a basis as would tend to encourage those manufactures adapted to colonial wants, and involve the development of colonial resources.

A School of Art and Design would obtain a wider scope for its usefulness, and combine with a cultivation of graceful tastes an element of utilitarianism suited to the present position and future growth of the colony. Again, the proposed lectures or discourses on art might be made of immense benefit, if the topics discussed were not simply confined to a description of 'the line of beauty,' or the peculiarities of a classical profile. We imagine that the subjects, if selected with a view to the exposition of manufactures, agriculture, and chemistry, and the adaptability they would bear to colonial uses, would afford an attraction to every class in the community, and secure for the Society the popular support. In making these remarks we wish to be understood as cordially supporting the promoters in their project; but we conceive that a broader basis than that foreshadowed will establish the Society in greater strength and usefulness.

The establishment of a gallery of art would doubtless bring to light many valuable works at present scattered in different parts of the province unknown or unappreciated. When such shall have been collected and classified, we believe great surprise and gratification will be experienced at the extent of our wealth in works of a high class. Probably many paintings of really good character have been brought to this colony, especially from Germany and France, in the possession of families to whom they have descended as heirlooms, and who have hung them upon their walls simply as relics long after the name of the master has been lost, and long after the subject has ceased to be distinguishable under the smoky accumulations of age. If these could be brought together, ample work would be provided both for the connoisseur and the Restoration Committee.

'In addition to works of this class it may fairly be anticipated that many creditable productions will find their way into the exhibition from the easels of colonial amateurs, many of whom are not only industrious, but also deserving of the title of clever artists. And if an exhibition offers advantages to any class of persons, surely the amateur will expect to reap the greatest benefit, for he will have all the influences of comparison and competition. With such prospects before them, we shall feel great disappointment if the promoters of the Society of Arts do not spiritedly carry out their enterprise. From the names of the Provisional Committee — appointed to make rules and regulations for carrying out the objects of the Society— we feel assured that the project will be fairly started under the most favorable auspices, and with a good prospect of success.

The Society first met early in 1857 and became known to the general public by an exhibition held in March of that year, when membership had reached around 60 and some 300 objects were shown, of which around 200 were paintings, though few would have been works by the exhibitor and made in the Colony. Thomas Wilson, in his opening speech, envisaged the formation of a School of Design and an Art Union, by means of which fortunate investors would become owners of local art at a small cost, and artists provided with a living. A competition was held in conjunction with this exhibition, won by J. H. Adamson, with his painting The First Steamer on the Murray, and the Surprise of the Natives. Adamson later worked in New Zealand.

=== Decline and revival ===
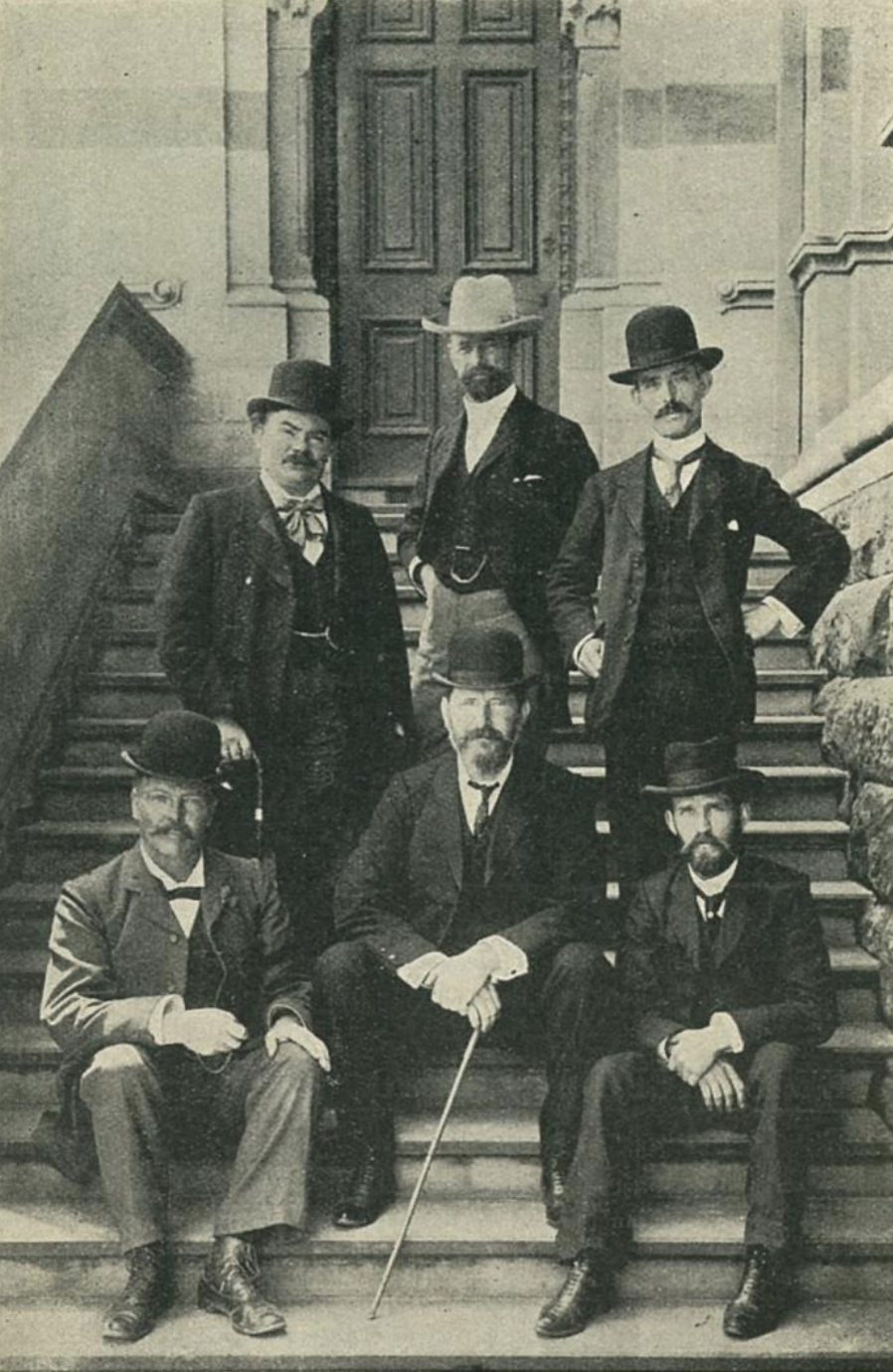
South Australian Society of Arts Selection and Hanging Committee 1902: Harry P Gill (Chairman), J. White, J. Ashton, Edward Davies, J. Keene and H.E. Powell (Hon.Sec)

At a General Meeting held at the Eagle Chambers on 7 June 1892 Minchin's resignation as secretary was accepted, and a new board elected: H. P. Gill, president of the School of Design, as president, W. K. Gold (secretary), H. E. Powell (treasurer), and a new committee consisted of A. Scott Broad, M. F. Cavanagh, James Keane, G. A. Reynolds, and W. J. Wadham, all but Keane having been members of Gill's Adelaide Art Circle. M. F. Cavanagh was subsequently named as the society's representative on the board of governors of the Public Library.

At a subsequent General Meeting held on 12 September 1892 at the board room of the Public Library, Museum, and Art Gallery on North Terrace, Chief Justice Samuel Way was elected president, Gold, Powell, and Cavanagh confirmed to their previously elected positions, D. Murray, Henry Scott and Gill as vice-presidents. The 1860 rules were rescinded and the new rules (as amended) were approved to be presented at the October Annual General Meeting in October.

At the end of that year, many members, including Wadham and his brother Alf Sinclair, Reynolds and Broad, left the Society to form the Adelaide Easel Club.

The Easel Club merged with the Society of Arts in 1901, largely through the diplomatic efforts of the society's president, Chief Justice Way and Prof. W. H. Bragg.

=== Breakaway group (1942) ===
In 1942, a group of RSASA associates broke away and formed the South Australian branch of the Contemporary Art Society (Contemporary Art Society of South Australia, or CASSA), as they felt that RSASA was not keeping up with modern trends in art. CASSA continued to maintain links with RSASA, with many members belonging to both organisations (including Ivor Francis). CASSA held an annual exhibition at the RSASA Gallery until 1964, when it secured gallery space in Porter Street, Parkside. The two societies gradually diverged, with CASSA becoming Contemporary Art Centre of South Australia (CACSA), and as of 2016 collaborating with the Australian Experimental Art Foundation to develop a new contemporary art organisation in Adelaide.

=== 21st century ===
In 2016, on the occasion of the 160th anniversary of RSASA, artist and art historian Adam Dutkiewicz (son of prominent artist Wladyslaw Dutkiewicz) compiled and edited a 400-page book to mark the occasion, a history of the Royal South Australian Society of Arts from 1856 to 2016. A second volume was published in 2017. In November–December 2016, the society held an exhibition titled Proud to be 160.

== Description ==
As of November 2026, the RSASA represents around 330 members, and has 100 Fellows. It has close relationships with the Adelaide Central School of Art, Helpmann Foundation, Guildhouse, and SALA Festival. The patron is Frances Adamson, former Governor of South Australia. The society is a registered charitable organisation.

Its gallery is in Level 1 of the Institute Building in Adelaide. It is Australia's oldest continuously running art society.

As of 2016, the director was Bev Bills.

== Awards and exhibitions ==
Prizes are sponsored by the M & M Carbins Trust and the Kennedy Art Foundation. As of 2026, the following events are held by RSASA:

- Youthscape art prize and exhibition for artists 15 to 26 years, with the top prize worth A$5,000 (established 2002)
- Two annual A$5,000 awards to first-year students studying at the Adelaide Central School of Art
- A residency of up to A$20,000 in the Royal Academy in London, for final-year students to work on projects over 2–3 months
- Biennial RSASA/SALA Characters of the Fleurieu exhibition, held at the Signal Point Gallery in Goolwa, with an acquisitive first prize of A$10,000
- Biennial RSASA/SALA Portrait Prize in the RSASA gallery, with an acquisitive first prize of $10,000
- Annual Kennedy Art Prize (Beauty), held in the RSASA gallery, with a first prize of $25,000.
- Four seasonal members' exhibitions each year
- Other solo, group, and historical exhibitions

== Past office holders ==
=== President ===
- 1857–1862 Sir R. G. MacDonnell
- 1862–1868 Sir Dominick Daly
- 1868–1873 Sir James Fergusson
- 1873–1877 Sir Anthony Musgrave
- 1877–1883 Sir William Jervois
- 1883–1889 Sir William Robinson
- 1889–1892 (perhaps) Lord Kintore
- 1892 H. P. Gill (pro tem)
- 1892–1909 Samuel Way
- 1909–1911 H. P. Gill
- 1911–1914 John White
- 1914–1918 James Ashton
- 1919–1921 John White
- 1921–1923 Edward Davies
- 1923–1927 John White
- 1927–1932 L. H. Howie
- 1932–1934 Leslie Wilkie
- 1934–1935 H. E. Fuller

(became Royal South Australian Society of Arts 1935)

- 1935–1937 L. H. Howie
- 1937–1940 John C. Goodchild
- 1940–1950 George Whinnen (died in office)
- 1950–1953 Duncan Goldfinch
- 1953–1956 F. Millward Grey
- 1956–1958 Allan C. Glover
- 1958–1959 Paul Beadle
- 1959–1964 John S. Dowie
- 1964– Stewart Gates

=== Secretary ===
- 1857–1866 James Macgeorge
- 1866–1885 Abraham Abrahams
- 1887–1892 R. E. Minchin
- 1892–1895 W. K. Gold
- 1895–1898 Sydney H. James (resigned)
- 1898 H. E. Fuller
- 1898–1921 Herbert E(dward). Powell
- 1921–1947 H. E. Fuller (also served as Treasurer for 24 years)
- 1947–1954 Lisette Kohlhagen

== Melrose Prize (historical) ==
Named for Alex Melrose (1865–1944), chairman of trustees of the Art Gallery of South Australia, the prize for portraiture was instituted in 1921 as a £25 prize awarded annually, then £100 awarded triennially from 1949, when the source of its funding changed and was renamed "Melrose Memorial Prize". Prizewinners included:

- 1921 May Grigg (for a portrait of her father Thomas Grigg)
- 1922 May Grigg (James Ashton)
- 1923 d'Auvergne Boxall ("Girl with Orange Scarf")
- 1925 d'Auvergne Boxall (Self-portrait)
- 1927 Leslie Wilkie ("Jean")
- 1928 Leslie Wilkie (George Whinnen)
- 1929 George Whinnen ("The Student")
- 1930 J. Wilson (plaster bust of Mr Wilson Sr)
- 1931 Frank L. Collie (plaster statue "What Makes the Wheels Go Round?")
- 1932 George Whinnen (Lieut. N. C. Adams)
- 1933 Nora Heysen (Self-portrait) (Note: According to several modern references, Heysen's 1933 Ruth was the winning portrait, however no painting of that name was entered for consideration, contemporary accounts in both Adelaide newspapers refer to the winning entry as "Self portrait", and the painting Ruth held by the Art Gallery of SA bears no resemblance to the photograph of Heysen's winning entry in The News.)
- 1934 Everton Shaw (plaster bust of a young woman)
- 1935 Ivor Hele (James Ferries)
- 1936 Ivor Hele
- 1937 William Rowell ("The Airman")
- 1938 Orlando Dutton
- 1939 Ivor Hele ("Jean")
- 1940 Dora Chapman
- 1941 Nora Heysen ("Mother and Child")
- 1942 Marguerite Richardson (plaster model "Crucifix")
- 1949 Russell Drysdale ("Woman in a Landscape")
- 1952 Charles Bush
- 1955 J. Carington Smith
- 1958 Jacqueline Hick
- 1961 Dora Chapman
- 1963(?) John Rigby
- 1967 Michael Kmit
