= Edward Davies (architect) =

Australian architect and landscape painter

Edward Davies F.S.A.I.A. (12 April 1852 – 2 April 1927) was an architect and arts administrator in South Australia.

== History ==
Davies was born in Newport, Wales, and emigrated to Melbourne with his parents when quite young. His father Edward was a tanner, and immediately started a tanning business at Richmond on the banks of the Yarra. He was to follow in his father's business, but was persuaded by Joseph Lambeth to study drawing.

He served a five-year apprenticeship with Albert Purchas, a Melbourne architect, then after a few years experience in the building trade joined the Victorian Education Department as a draftsman. In 1876 he joined the South Australian Education Department as a senior draftsman under J. E. Woods. He left the Public Service to work with architect James Cummings, and after winning design competitions for Clayton Congregational Church, Kensington and East Adelaide Congregational Church was admitted as a partner. He left Cummings & Davies in 1884 to work on his own, winning contracts for the Commercial Bank and National Mutual Life Association buildings in King William Street and the Savings Bank building in Currie Street. In September 1887 he took Hedley Dunn as partner in Flinders Street, partnership dissolved 1888. In 1906 he took his student C. W. Rutt into partnership as Edward Davies & Rutt. He was for six years president of the South Australian Association of Architects.

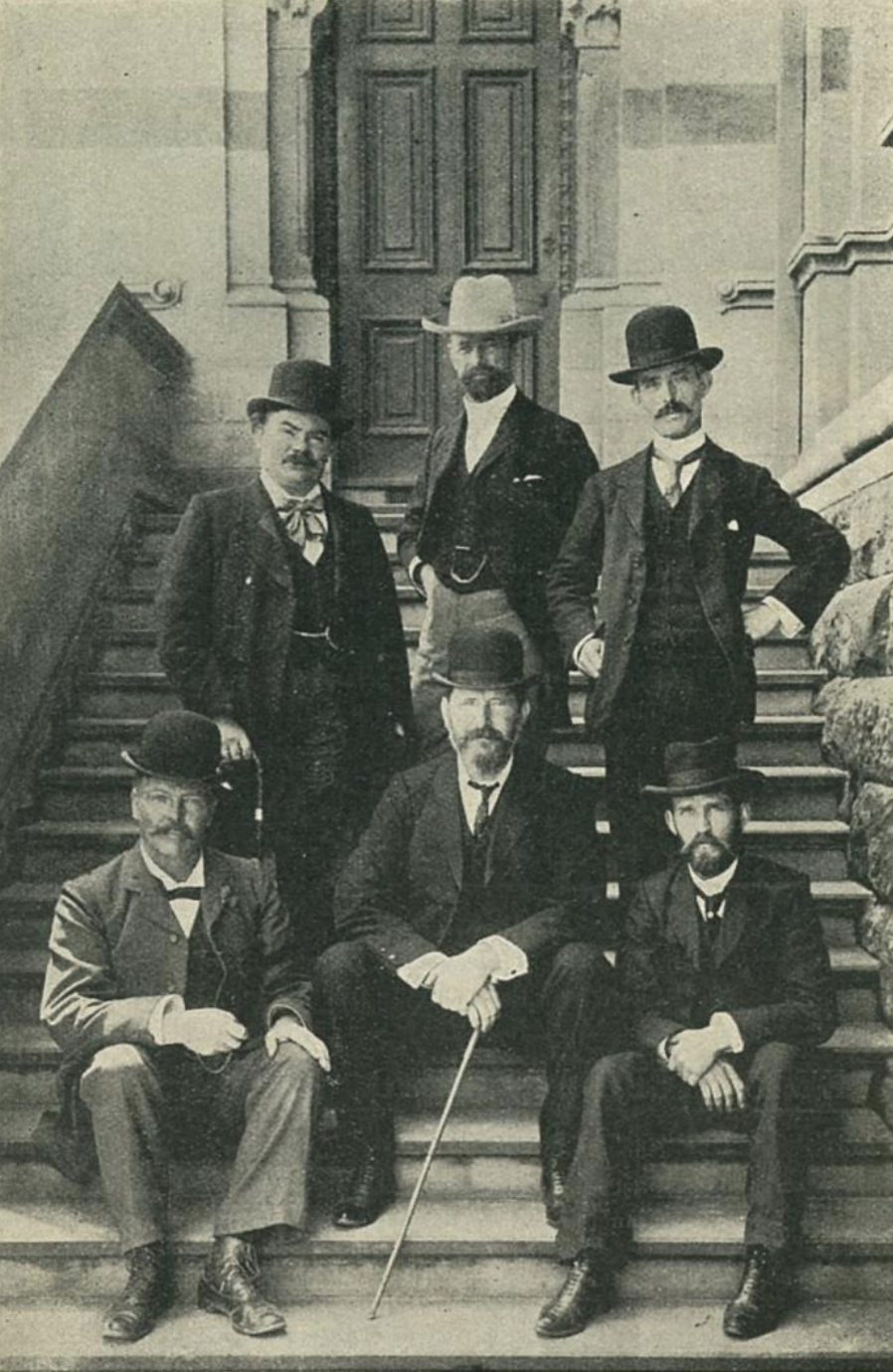
South Australian Society of Arts Selection and Hanging Committee 1902: Mr Harry P Gill (Chairman), Messrs J. White, J Ashton, Edward Davies, J Keene and H.E. Powell (Hon.Sec)

He was a keen and accomplished artist in oils and watercolor, and was a member of the short-lived Adelaide Art Circle (H. P. Gill was its president), then the Adelaide Easel Club and its successor, the South Australian Society of Arts, of which he served as president from 1921 to 1923. He was vice-president of the South Australian School of Arts. One of his landscapes is held by the Art Gallery of South Australia. Two particular friends were noted artists – James Ashton, with whom he spent a painting holiday every year, and Paris Nesbit, who died just a few days before him.

He was a founder in 1912 of the Dual Club of Adelaide, and a contributor to its title (E Davies, C. A. Uhrlab, J. Ashton, and H. H. Ling. The aim of the club was to promote both Art and Science, and was still going strong when Davies, the last of the four, died.

He was hon. curator of the Adelaide Gallery from 1909 to 1915, and chairman of the Board of Management, Public Art Gallery and Museum of South Australia.

== Family ==
He married Rhoda Catherine Sexton (11 October 1849 – 5 October 1902) on 11 October 1876. Their children included:

- Edith Rhoda Davies (24 November 1877 – ) married Albert Victor Hannah
- Mabel Davies (29 June 1879 – 12 September 1968), adopted daughter of Charles H. F. Schild, married Frederick Trevenen-Pitt on 23 April 1907, lived at Yankalilla
- Frances Maude Davies (28 January 1881 – 7 May 1971) married architect Louis Laybourne Smith on 9 April 1903, lived at Millswood.
- Clarence Edward Davies (ca.1882 – 2 June 1943), architect, married Amelia "Millie" Opie on 13 February 1917
- Ernest Llewellyn Davies (1884 – 3 February 1955) lived in Auckland, New Zealand
- Percy Hamilton Davies (1 August 1886 – ) moved to Gold Coast, Africa
- Stewart Lancelot Davies (27 May 1888 – ) moved to Gold Coast, Africa
- Henry "Harry" Durham Davies (7 October 1889 – 3 January 1966) lived in Port Lincoln, fought in World War I, awarded DCM, married Eliza Catherine Walker on 3 January 1926.
- Olive Davies (26 July 1891 – 9 June 1987) married Leonard Martin on 19 November 1913, lived at Broadway, Glenelg

He married again, on 23 December 1903 to Ada Egan (26 February 1862 – 22 September 1924). They had no children together.
