= Hermann Heinicke =

(1863–1949) musician

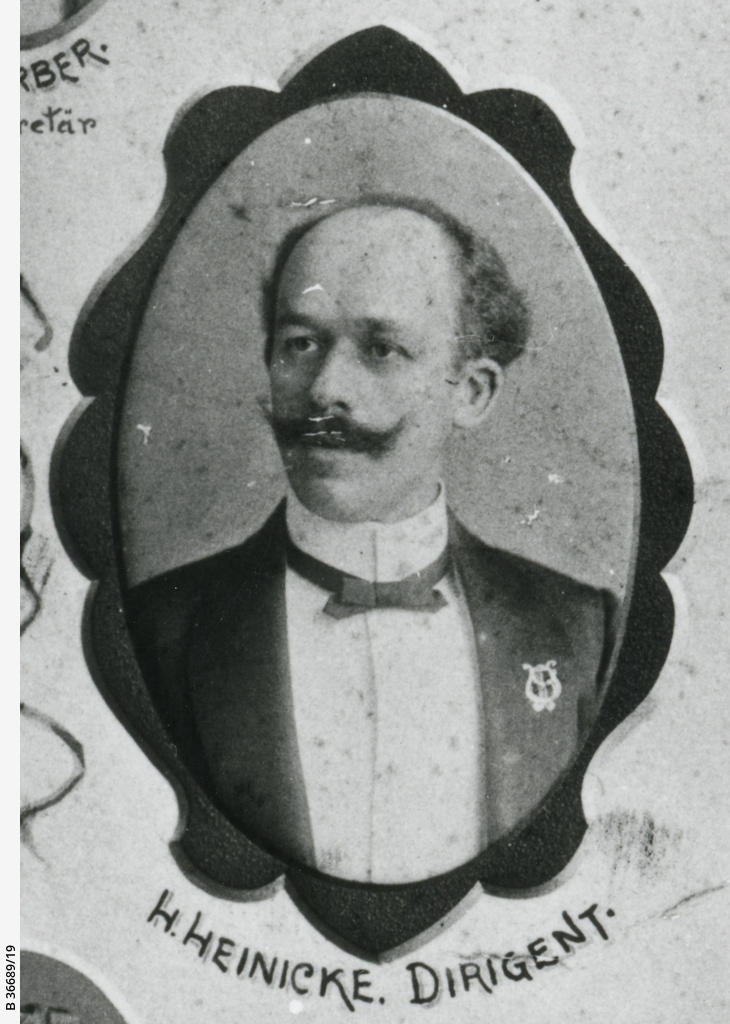

Background information
- Born: 21 July 1863; Dresden, Germany
- Died: 11 July 1949 (aged 85) Adelaide, Australia
- Genres: classical
- Occupations: musician; music teacher; conductor
- Instruments: violin

August Moritz Hermann Heinicke (21 July 1863 – 11 July 1949), only ever known as Hermann or Herr Heinicke, was a German-born violinist and music teacher in South Australia. He founded Heinicke's Grand Orchestra and was the first conductor of the Adelaide Conservatorium orchestra.

== History ==
Hermann was born in Dresden, a son of August Moritz Hermann Heinicke, a brush manufacturer, in a family with a great musical tradition. At the age of 10 he entered the Conservatorium and studied violin for four years under Albert Wolfermann, the leading virtuoso of the Royal Opera House. He won the King of Saxony's scholarship and studied for three years under Eduard Rappoldi, Franz Wüllner and no doubt others; this was extended for another two or three years. His first commercial engagement was with the "Gewerbe Haus", a popular concert hall, after which he was leader then conductor of an orchestra at the thermal springs resort at Buxton, near Manchester, whose soloists had included violinist Lady Hallé (Wilma Neruda) and the Dutch 'cellist Gerard Vollmar (1859–1907). He returned to Germany, and was engaged as leader and deputy conductor of the Berlin Concert House Orchestra, when he read an advertisement placed by Gotthold Reimann for a violin teacher with his College of Music in Wakefield Street, Adelaide. Heinicke was chosen from 124 applicants.

He arrived in Adelaide in June 1890, serving as teacher of violin, viola and orchestral playing, and saw the College develop into a popular and highly regarded institution with 240 students. He was instrumental in building up the Adelaide Liedertafel, and in 1892 founded Heinicke's Grand Orchestra of 38 players which, with managerial assistance from Charles Cawthorne, gave popular Saturday concerts in the Adelaide Town Hall. Eugene Alderman played first violin; his mother Valentina Alderman on viola was, as a woman member of an orchestra, a rarity at that time. A. C. Quin was orchestra leader. The standard was high, but remuneration low, and all members had other sources of income.

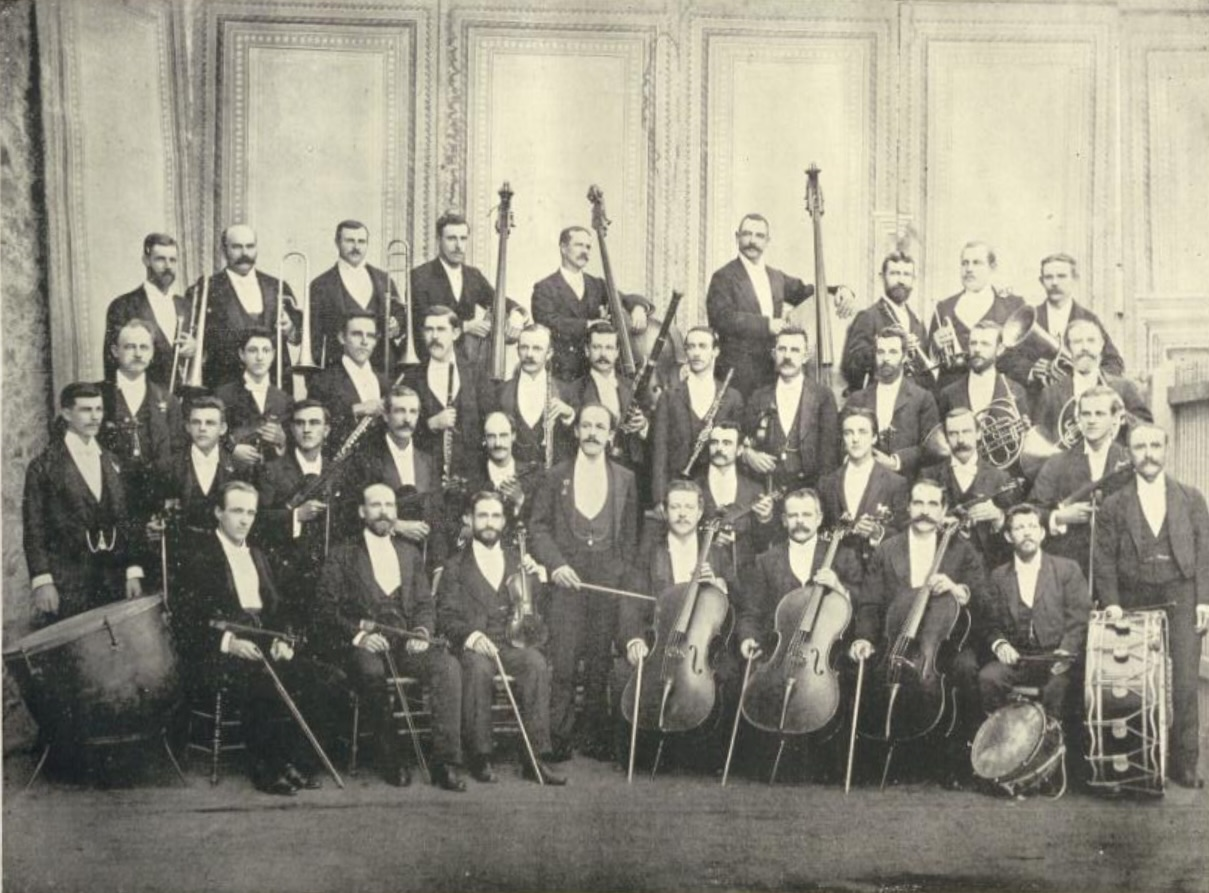
Heinicke's Grand Orchestra in 1896

In 1891 he was appointed conductor with the Adelaide Liedertafel, a post he held until 1914.

In 1898 the Adelaide College of Music became the nucleus of the newly founded Conservatorium of Music, and with extra responsibilities, Heinicke was forced to curtail his involvement with the orchestra. In 1893 he took over Charles Cawthorne's Adelaide Grand Orchestra. Harry Winsloe Hall, Guli Hack's successor as teacher of singing at the Conservatorium, was later appointed conductor.

With the advent of the Great War, Heinicke was the object of a great deal of abuse because of his German heritage. He resigned from the Conservatorium in April 1916. The South Australian Orchestra, headed by Professor E. Harold Davies, with bassoonist W. H. Foote, A.R.C.M. as conductor 1921–1931, took over the assets of the Conservatorium Orchestra. Heinicke continued teaching privately until 1933, and ran a piano retail business for a few years from 1925.

In 1931 Heinicke was appointed Honorary conductor of the newly formed Adelaide Philharmonic Orchestra. The orchestra played three concerts at the Exhibition Hall in December that year, but despite positive critiques failed financially.

He died at his North Adelaide home; there was only a very small obituary in one of Adelaide's two newspapers and no mention in the other, yet before World War II he was nominated one of the 15 notable SA musicians of the period: Frederick Bevan, Charles Cawthorne, E. Harold Davies, J. M. Dunn, Thomas Grigg, Hermann Heinicke, John Horner, E. H. Wallace Packer, Harold S. Parsons, W. R. Pybus, I. G. Reimann, William Silver, C. J. Stevens, Oscar Taeuber, Arthur Williamson.

== Notable students ==
- William Cade
- Daisy Kennedy

== Family ==
He married Minna Eugene Gebhardt on 26 May 1908; they lived at 37 Strangways Terrace in North Adelaide. They had two sons:

- Lancelot William "Bill" Heinicke OBE (1909–1985) of Plympton, South Australia. He was decorated for services during volcanic eruption on Rabaul in May 1937.
- Kenneth Charles "Ken" Heinicke (1910–1998) married Nancy Muriel Steele on 22 March 1941, lived at Tooperang, South Australia

== Other interests ==
Hermann was a longtime habitué of Kindermann's (later Bishop's) Café on Rundle Street, where he was known to enjoy a game of chess.
