= Adelaide Art Circle =

Association of artists in South Australia founded by H. P. Gill

- Formation: 1890
- Founder: H. P. Gill
- Dissolved: 1892
- Type: Artists' association
- Purpose: Monthly critique meetings and annual exhibitions
- Location: Adelaide, South Australia
- Members: Limited to 12 professional artists (by invitation)
- Key people: H. P. Gill (President), G. A. Reynolds (Secretary)

The Adelaide Art Circle was an association of artists in Adelaide, South Australia, founded by H. P. Gill.

The club was founded early in 1890, with Gill as president and G. A. Reynolds as hon. secretary. According to the rules as laid down by Gill, membership was restricted to professional artists, by invitation, and limited to 12 members. They would meet monthly in one or other of the members' homes, and each had to submit a new work to be critiqued by the other members. They would hold annual exhibitions.

The first members were Gill and Reynolds, W. P. H. Haines, (Note: Watercolorist William Pearce Herbert Haines, recently arrived from England, was a master at Gawler School of Design, resigned 1891 through ill health, died 15 July, aged 28.) A(lfred) Scott Broad, Edward Davies, M. F. Cavanagh, H. E. Powell, W. K. Gold, E. J. Woods and W. J. Maxwell. W. J. Wadham and his brother Alf Sinclair were elected to the circle in 1892. Two exhibitions were held, and generally well received, but clearly dominated by Gill's prodigious output. The club folded in 1892 without fanfare, but seemed to coincide with the rebirth of the moribund South Australian Society of Arts and the election to its board of Gill president), Gold (secretary), Powell (treasurer), and a new committee consisted of Broad, Cavanagh, James Keane, (Note: James Joseph Keane (died 1941) was a longtime council member of Society of Arts and art master at several prestigious schools. He was a regular correspondent on the subject of art gallery architecture.) Reynolds, and Wadham, Keane was alone in not being a member of the Circle.

In December that year the Wadham brothers, Reynolds and Broad broke away from the Society of Arts to help found the Adelaide Easel Club. The Easel Club merged with the Society of Arts in 1901, largely through the diplomatic efforts of the society's president, Chief Justice Way and Prof. W. H. Bragg.
