= Allan C. Glover =

Australian painter and etcher (1900–1984)

Allan Clifford Glover (9 August 1900 – 1984) was an Australian artist, best known as an etcher and printmaker.

== History ==
Glover was born in South Australia the eldest son of John Sydney Glover (1875 – 30 August 1919) and his wife Lucy Emily Glover née Smith of Duke Street, Kensington.

He attended the South Australian School of Arts and Crafts from 1921 to 1934, studying painting under May Grigg and etching under John C. Goodchild.

In 1925 he was admitted to the South Australian Society of Arts as an associate member, and exhibited with the Society the following year. In 1927 he staged his first one-man exhibitions. He served as president of the Royal South Australian Society of Arts 1956–1968.
