= G. A. Reynolds =

Australian art teacher (1854–1939)

George Alfred Reynolds (26 November 1854 – 8 April 1939) was an artist and art teacher in South Australia.

Reynolds was born the second son of Stephen James Reynolds of "Sandsworth", Birmingham, and studied at the Birmingham School of Art for six years, then was appointed him to one of the school's branches by head master Edward R. Taylor; shortly afterwards he gained the Art Master's Certificate in London.

He accepted the position of first assistant in Adelaide's School of Design under H. P. Gill, which position he held 1887–1891. During that time, Mr. Reynolds was frequently employed by the Inspector-General of Schools to produce illustrations for the reading books used by State schools, then was appointed art master with the Education Department, supervising art examinations in city and suburban schools, and art instruction at the Teachers' Training College in Grote Street. He was also responsible for the art curriculum in South Australian public schools, and designed eleven drawing books for their use. He was an active member of the South Australian Society of Arts 1887–1899, and was a founding member of the Adelaide Art Circle and Adelaide Easel Club. At their annual exhibitions his paintings and copperplate etchings were noted for their high standard, and he was the first in South Australia to etch and print a copperplate etching of any importance.

In 1899, he was appointed director of the Ballarat Technical Art School, succeeding Carew Smith, who had accepted the position of inspector of drawing in Victorian State schools. He resigned from Ballarat in 1905 and in 1906 founded an art school in Mount Gambier, then was appointed to the Education Department, serving for 26 years in Mount Gambier, where after retirement at age 76 he continued to live and create until his death in 1939.

== Family ==
Reynolds married Mary Jane "Jeannie" Korff (1 February 1857 – 26 May 1925) of Gawler on 27 December 1888; they had two children:

- Rudolf F. Reynolds (25 November 1890 – 21 Mar 1978) of Melbourne
- Bertha M. Reynolds (18 April 1895 – 14 July 1981) of Mount Gambier

Their home for many years was Penola Road, then Wyatt Street, Mount Gambier.
