= May Grigg =

Australian artist

- Self portrait ca. 1936
- Born: Mabel (May) Grigg; 1885; Hindmarsh, Australia
- Died: 1969 (aged 83–84); Adelaide, Australia
- Known for: Painting

Mabel "May" Grigg (1885–1969), was an Australian painter. She won the Alexander Melrose Prize for portraiture in 1921 and 1922.

== Biography ==
Grigg was born in 1885 in Hindmarsh, South Australia, the third of five daughters of Rachel Grigg, née Worthley, and Thomas Grigg, a noted violinist, conductor and music teacher. May studied at the South Australian School of Design in Adelaide. Her teachers included Harry Gill and Hans Heysen.

Grigg was a council member at the Royal South Australian Society of Arts. Grigg had a career as a teacher. She was senior art mistress at Ballarat Technical Art School and the South Australian School of Arts and Crafts.

Grigg died in 1969 in Adelaide.

Her sister Etta Grigg was an accomplished viola player.
