= Leslie Wilkie =

Australian painter (1878–1935)

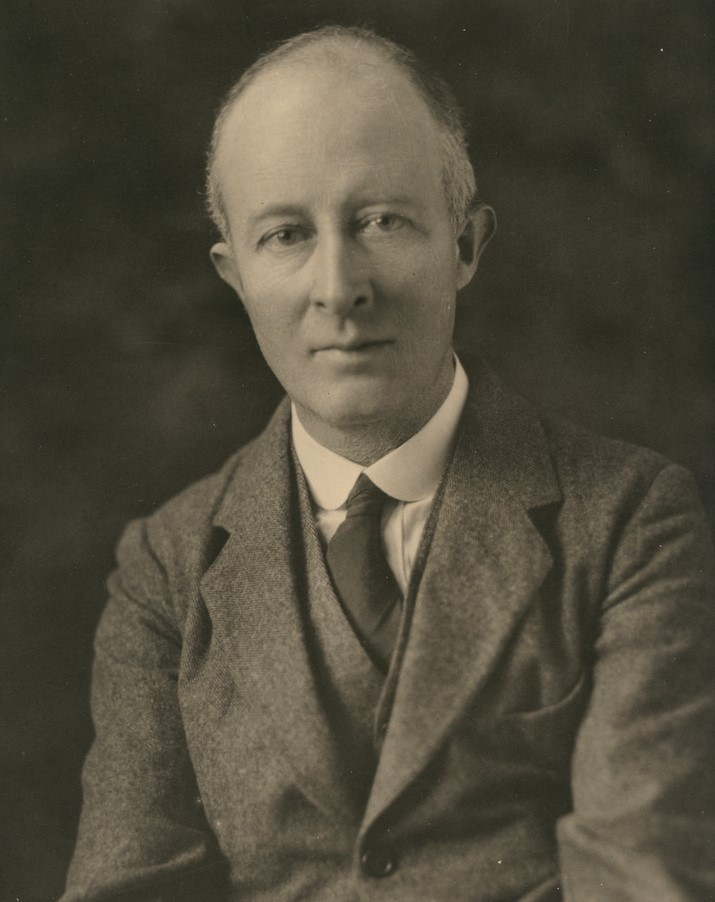
- Born: Leslie Andrew Alexander Wilkie; 27 June 1878; Royal Park, Melbourne, Victoria
- Died: 4 September 1935; Adelaide, South Australia
- Resting place: St Saviour's Anglican churchyard, Glen Osmond
- Education: National Gallery schools, Melbourne, under Lindsay Bernard Hall
- Known for: Portrait painting; first director of the Art Gallery of South Australia
- Spouse: Alma Rubina Tunnock (m. 1913; died 1930)
- Children: 1
- Awards: Melrose Prize, 1927 and 1928

Leslie Andrew Alexander Wilkie (27 June 1878 – 4 September 1935) was an Australian artist and the president of the South Australian Society of Arts from 1932 to 1934.

== Early life ==
Wilkie was born at Royal Park, Melbourne, the son of David Wilkie and Mary Frances, née Rutherford. He was a grand-nephew of Sir David Wilkie. He was educated at Brunswick College and in 1896 entered the National Gallery of Victoria school at Melbourne under Lindsay Bernard Hall.

== Art career ==
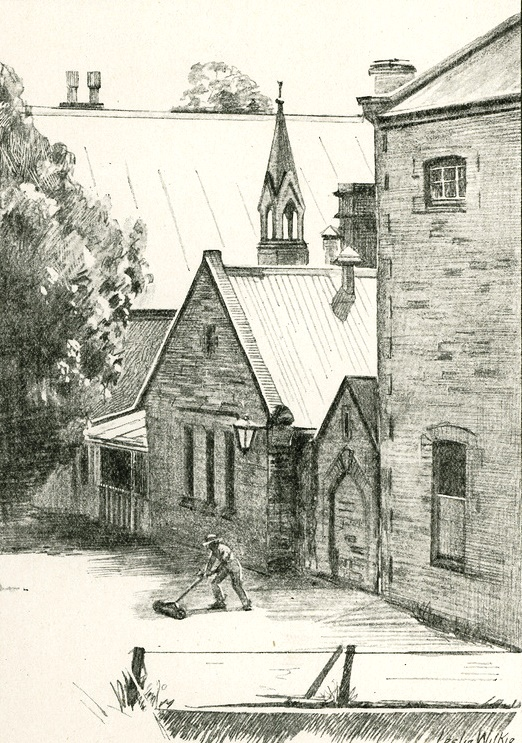
1931 drawing by Wilkie of part of Adelaide Destitute Asylum.

He occupied a studio, during WW1 and into the early 1920s, on the fourth floor in the Austral buildings 115-119 Collins Street, Melbourne, where John Mather, Charles E. Gordon-Frazer, Alexander Colquhoun and the photographer J.W. Lindt also practiced. A brief profile of Wilkie after his return from Europe appeared in a 1907 edition of The Native companion, which mentions also that he sat for a bronze bust by G. Web Gilbert. In 1919 Colquhoun also wrote a short biography of Wilkie for the biannual Art in Australia.

== Reception ==
Wilkie was for several years, an illustrator on the staff of The Argus and The Australasian, and was briefly the art critic for The Age newspaper, and from 1901, received several early reviews himself in The Bulletin that declared his art 'promising', but others after 1907 that were less complimentary about his use of colour and lack of 'grace' or 'charm' in drawing.

A member of the Australian Art Association under President W. B. McInnes in 1912, Wilkie was made secretary, replaced by Edward Officer in 1914, after whose death Wilkie resumed the position in 1923.

By 1914, starting with a Punch review of a show in his studio, he became recognised as a successful portraitist. John Shirlow commented that 'the distinctive charm of the best of Wilkle's work is his tenderly sympathetic observation of the character of girlhood, and of young womanhood,' that assured him an 'honoured place' in the genre.

In the fourth Australian Art Association annual exhibition at the Athenaeum, opened by the Governor and his A.D.C. the screenwriter Capt. Conant in October 1916, "vibrating light" in Wilkie's study of an interior was praised in an upbeat Argus review.

The Herald critic James Stuart MacDonald (an Association member himself) of the subject of Leslie Wilkie's Bonnie Jean hung in the organisation's 1925 show, wrote that it depicted "A sweet little girl in which every bit of girlish sweetness is conveyed".

== Gallery director ==
In August 1926, Association member Leslie Wilkie was invited to apply for the curatorship at the Art Gallery of South Australia in Adelaide, interviewed, and appointed on 1 September 1925, then farewelled by his Art Association comrades at the Ritz Cafe before his departure for Adelaide on the 29th, moving from Melbourne to Trevorten Avenue, Glenunga to take up the post. In replacing the recently resigned H. van Raalte, Wilkie proved popular.

Elected to the Royal Drawing Society, London in 1930, Wilkie became president of the Royal South Australian Society of Arts 1932-35, with which organisation he exhibited a portrait of his daughter Jean, a frequent model, in their 1932 Spring Exhibition.

In 1934 Wilkie joined a University of Adelaide anthropological expedition to Central Australia where he painted portraits of First Nations people near Cooper Creek. The portraits were later exhibited at the Art Gallery of South Australia.

== Personal life and death ==
Wilkie was forced to postpone a lecture on Modern Art in June 1935 when he became ill, with Mary P. Harris filling in with a lecture on Van Gogh, supported by a dramatisation by Wilkie's daughter Jean. He died aged fifty-six in an Adelaide private hospital on 4 September 1935 after successive operations for appendicitis and was buried in St Saviour's Anglican churchyard, Glen Osmond. His wife Alma (née Tunnock), a dentist and musician, had died aged 44 in 1930, and he was survived by their daughter, Jean. Andrew Wilkie (c. 1853–1948), director of the Melbourne Zoo 1923 to 1936, was an uncle. Leslie Wilkie's successor as Director of the Art Gallery of South Australia, Louis McCubbin, son of Frederick McCubbin, was appointed in December 1935.

== Collections ==
- National Library of Australia
- Australian War Memorial
- State Library of Victoria
- Athenaeum Club, Melbourne
- Art Gallery of New South Wales (works including Margaret and an unfinished self-portrait
- Art Gallery of South Australia
- Royal South Australian Society of Arts
- Castlemaine Art Museum
- Parliament House Art Collections, Canberra.

== Gallery ==
Selection of paintings by Leslie Wilkie

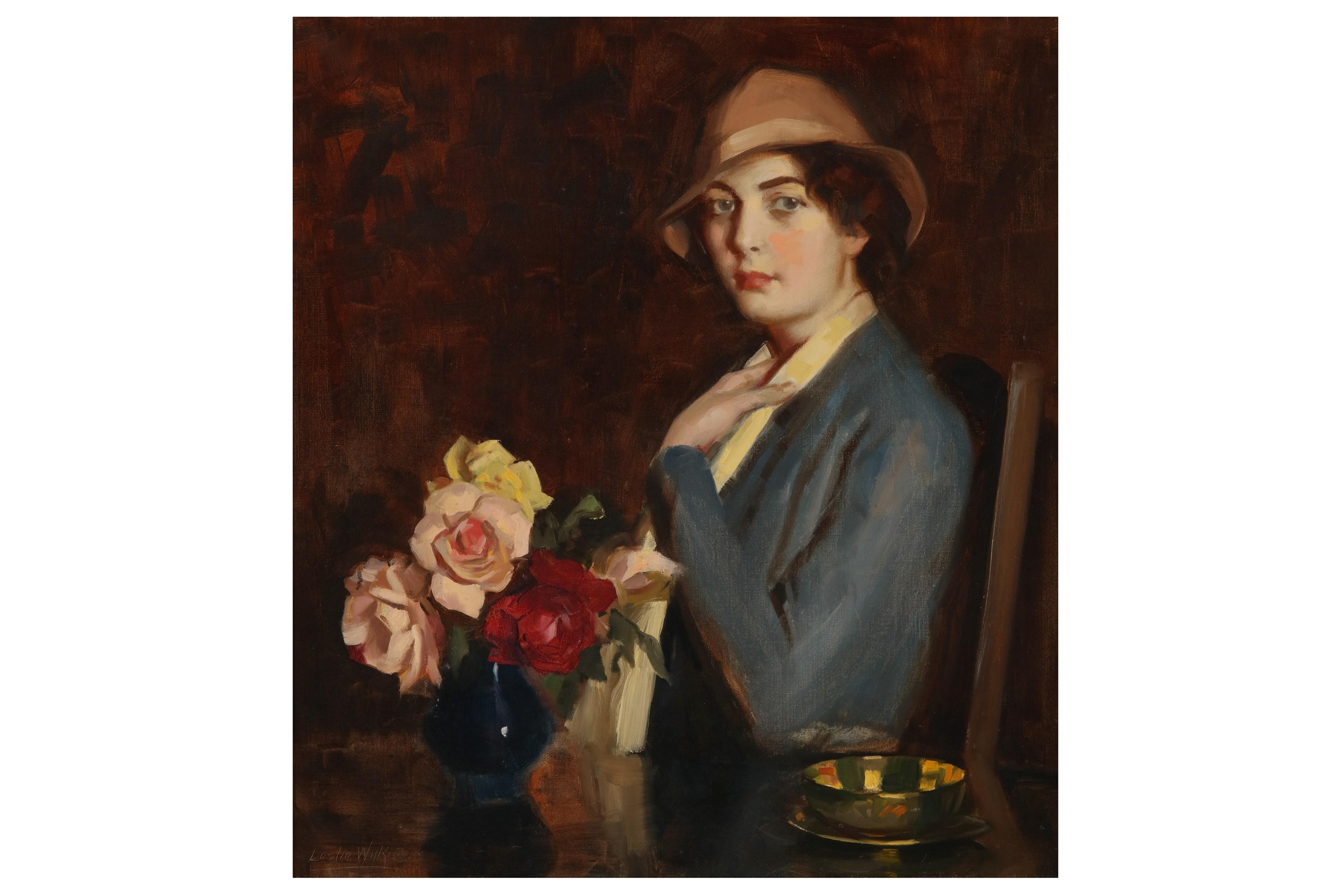
Miss Wilkie, the artist's daughter

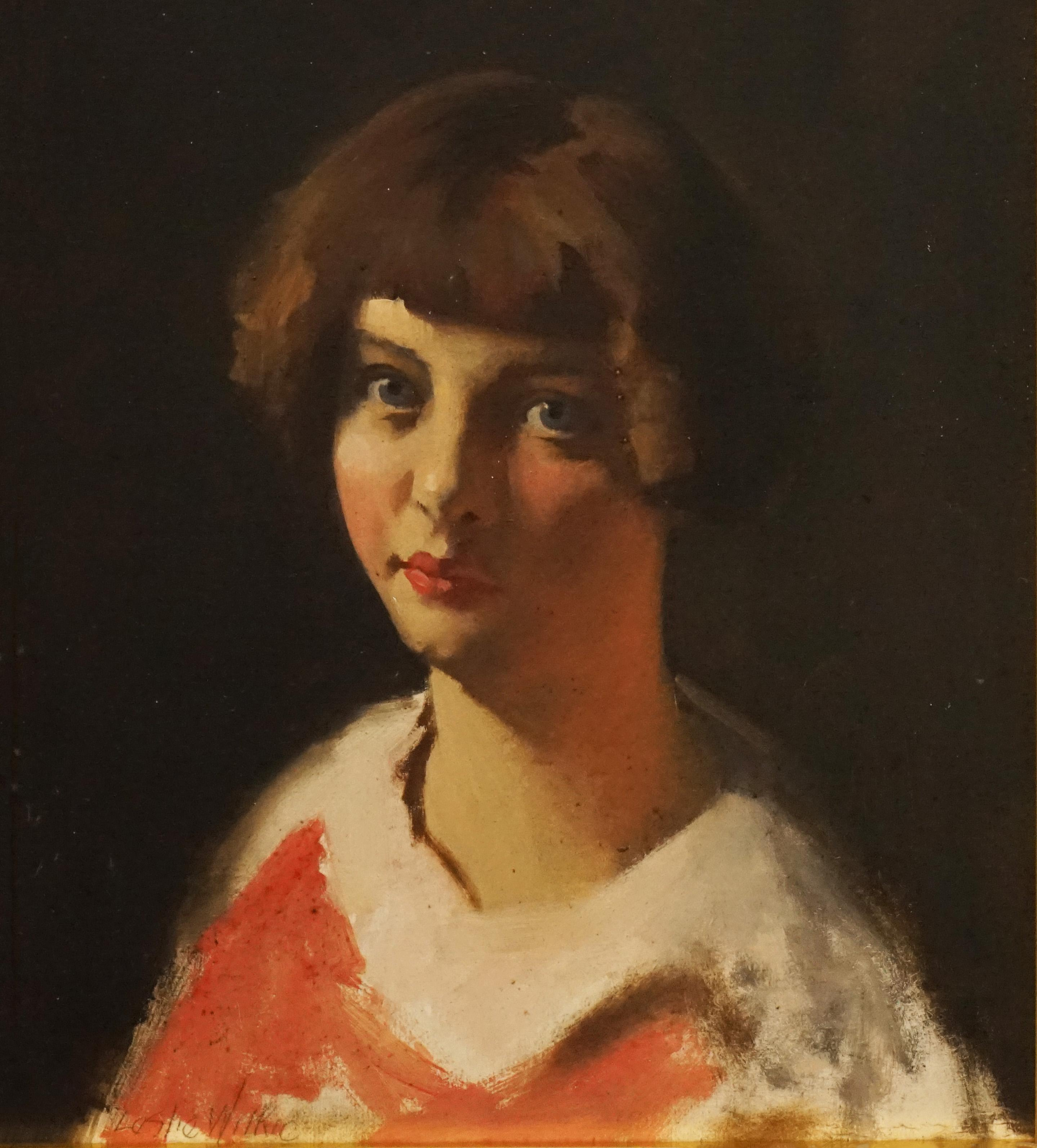
Portrait of Jean Wilkie, oil on board

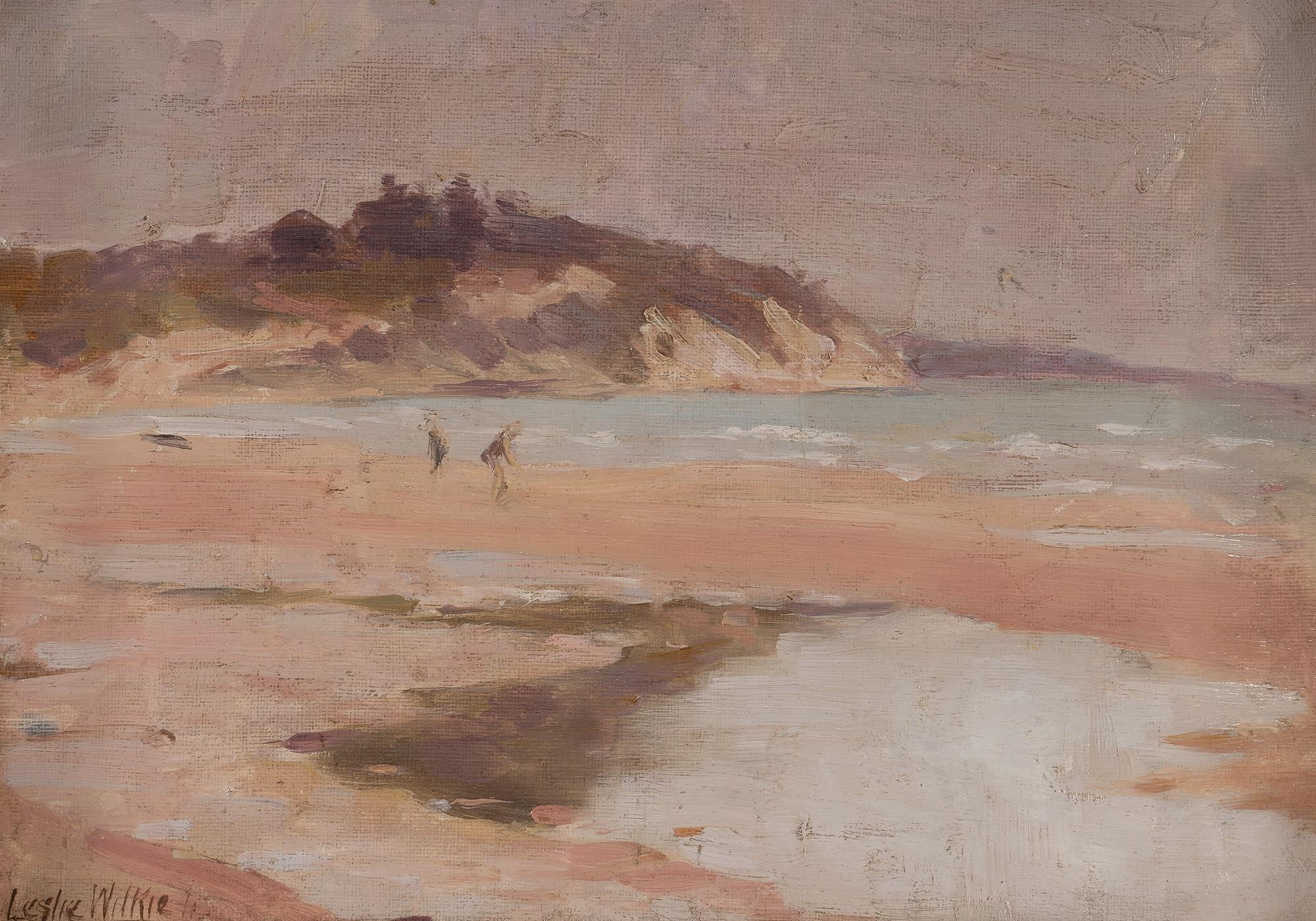
Early Morning Oliver's Hill

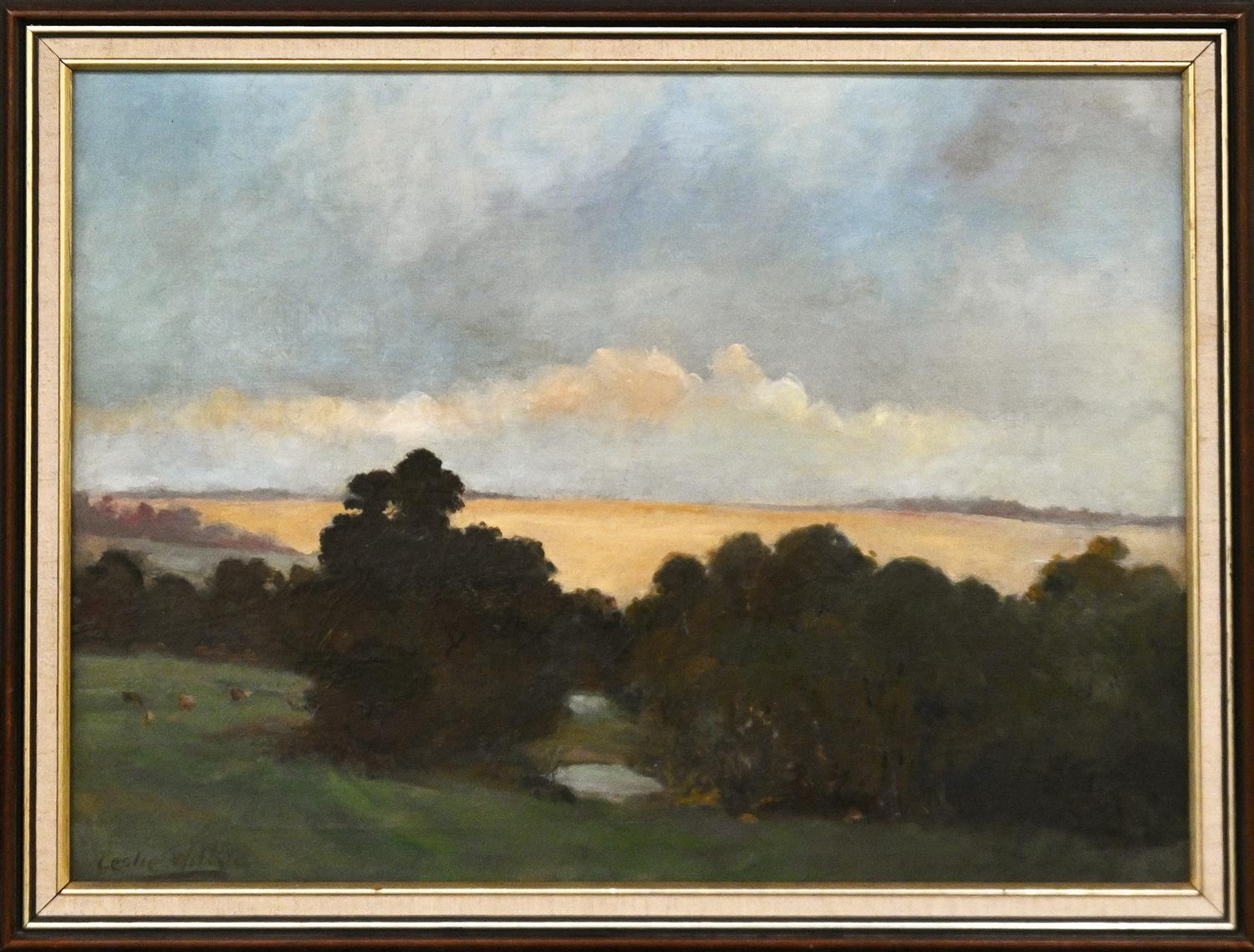
Landscape

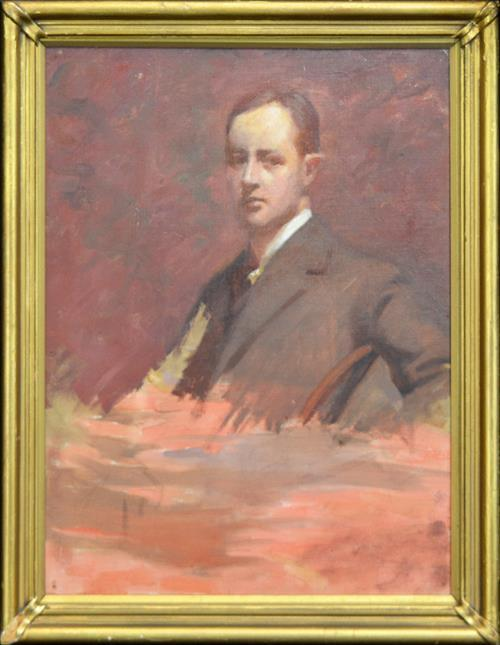
Leslie Wilkie - Self-portrait
