= Cawthorne and Co =

Australian music publishing, recording, and promotion (1870–1924)

Cawthorne and Co, also known as Cawthorne's Limited, was a company founded in 1870 in Adelaide, South Australia, by Charles Cawthorne and his father William Anderson Cawthorne (also known as W. A. Cawthorne), which dealt in musical instruments, sheet music and recordings, and acted as concert promoters.

== History ==
Cawthorne began writing for The Illustrated Melbourne Post in 1865, and seeing the possibilities in a similar publication in Adelaide, founded The Illustrated Adelaide Post in 1867, engaging Samuel Calvert as engraver.

In 1876, William Anderson Cawthorne and son Charles, as W. A. Cawthorne & Co., were book sellers operating from Morphett Street, Adelaide, and were publishing the Australian Handbook. They moved to Waymouth Street and by 1877 they had premises at 1–3 Franklin Street "Cawthorne Chambers", adjacent to the G.P.O. In March 1882 the shop started carrying sheet music and violin strings. and a year later materials for amateur dramatics.

In 1884 they opened in the new Y.M.C.A. building at Gawler Place, and by 1885 Cawthorne & Co. was acting as a booking agent for concerts. They retained the Franklin Street shop as a branch office until the Cyclorama Building (later West's picture theatre, 91 Hindley Street) opened, and the second shop moved there. Later the Gawler place premises were enlarged considerably and the Hindley street business closed.

In 1911 Cawthorne's moved to 17 Rundle Street, but in 1924 those premises were demolished and an up-to-date music warehouse was built. Around this time, three of Charles's four sons – Gus, Cyril and Frank – became involved in the company.

In 1924 a new company, "Cawthorne's Limited" was formed, with £20,000 capital, to take over the business and assets of Cawthorne & Co. Its first directors were Charles Witto-witto Cawthorne, Augustus Eckersley Cawthorne, Cyril Cawthorne, Frank Roy Cawthorne and William Miller.

== Family members ==
=== William Anderson Cawthorne ===
William Anderson Cawthorne (25 September 1825 – 25 September 1897), often referred to as W. A. Cawthorne, was an artist and teacher. He arrived in South Australia with his mother on the Amelia, which sailed from Liverpool via Cape Town, in 1841. His father, lighthouse keeper Captain William Cook Cawthorne, arrived on 22 April 1845 aboard the Victoria, from Western Australia.

By 1851 W. A. Cawthorne had with his mother founded a school on Morphett Street, but the following year was appointed headmaster of Pulteney Street Central Schools, then Victoria Square School in November 1856.

He was interested in Australian Aboriginal culture and made useful observations of Kaurna language and the people's customs. His interest is reflected in the middle names he gave some of his children. He wrote The Islanders (1854), a fictional account based on the early history of settlement on Kangaroo Island; Kupirri; or, the Red Kangaroo (1858), a reader for children; and a biography of Johann Menge (1859). He was a frequent visitor to the mission, school and camp at Piltawodli, was a close friend of Kadlitpina ("Captain Jack"), loved the Kaurna Palti "corroboree" and their material culture, and was responsible for recording many names of artefacts. His Rough Notes on the Manners and Customs of the Natives, written in 1844, was published in the 1925-26 Proceedings of the Royal Geographical Society of Australasia (SA Branch).

He was founding secretary of the Schoolmasters' Association. He was member of the Volunteer Military Force until 1863 when, as Captain of the West Adelaide Rifle Company, he resigned in protest at the Government's refusal to allow evening parades. In 1865 he stood for City councillor, Grey ward but was defeated. He was later successful and served from 1871 to 1873. He was secretary of the National Building Society from 1863 to 1892.

The "Victoria Square Academy Est. 1841" closed in December 1864. He then advertised himself as a telegraphic agent, and began stocking the Illustrated Melbourne Post, later the Australian Journal and other interstate and overseas magazines at business premises in Morphett Street.

William Cawthorne published the Illustrated Adelaide News from 1867 until the end of 1874, and published an Adelaide edition of the Australasian Sketcher from 1875 until 1885.

=== Charles Cawthorne ===
Charles Witto-witto Cawthorne (1 July 1854 – 26 June 1925) was with his father W. A. Cawthorne, founder of Cawthorne & Co. as a business involved in every aspect of music-making, and chairman of directors when the company became Cawthorne's Pty Ltd.

=== Gus Cawthorne ===
Augustus Eckersley "Gus" Cawthorne (29 April 1887 – 15 July 1937) was the eldest son of Charles Cawthorne, born in Adelaide. He was, with brothers Cyril and Frank, on the board of Cawthorne and Co., serving as managing director. Like his father, he was a prominent supporter of amateur theatre and music performance. He was a keen supporter of the brass band movement, and held office in several bands, and was also a vice-president of the Unley Orchestra.

He and A. J. Chapman (of Allan's Ltd., Cawthorne's chief competitor) founded the Dame Nellie Melba Memorial Fund, and Gus served as house manager for S. Talbot Smith's Repertory Theatre.

=== Genealogy ===
Captain William Cook Cawthorne (c.1799 – 28 September 1875) married Georgina Sarah (c.1802 – 14 June 1860). He was not on the same ship as his wife and son, Amelia, which arrived at Adelaide 1841, but in 1845 was recorded as arriving from the Swan River aboard Victoria. He was from 1851 to 1861 the (first) Head Keeper of the "Sturt" lighthouse on Cape Willoughby on Kangaroo Island. He married again, to Margaret Grant in 1862. They lived at Brighton.

William Anderson Cawthorne (c.1824 – 25 September 1897), schoolmaster, married Mary Ann Georgiana "Annie" Mower (1830 – 13 July 1884) on 24 June 1848; he married again, to Sarah Jane McArthur ( – ) on 13 October 1885. They lived on Currie Street, then Morphett Street, then Melbourne Street, North Adelaide. His last address was Gilbert Street, Goodwood. Jane remarried, to Walter Sherringham on 14 February 1899.

- Frederic William Cawthorne (2 May 1849 – 20 May 1873)
- Charles Witto-witto Cawthorne (see above) married (Amanda) Dorothea Lellmann (16 May 1964 – 18 September 1923) on 9 September 1885. They had a home on Valmai Avenue, King's Park, Northcote Street, Hawthorn.

- Augustus Eckersley "Gus" Cawthorne (29 April 1887 – 15 July 1937) married Edie Muriel Broad (1888 – 7 October 1948), a niece of Alfred Scott Broad; they lived at 40 Ningana Avenue, Kings Park

- elder daughter Dulcie Melveene Cawthorne (25 May 1916 – 8 June 1997) married Elwyne Vine on 20 May 1939
- Noel Cawthorne (25 December 1913 – ) married Phillis Irene Conway (8 May 1919 – ) prominent in amateur theatre; lived at Tusmore

- Mark Cawthorne (3 May 1942 – )
- Karin Cawthorne (c.1942 – ) née Ziche, adopted orphan from Germany.

- Dawn Cawthorne (20 May 1922 – 11 January 2007) engaged to Robert Jackson ( – ) in 1943

- Leslie Edward "Les" Cawthorne (27 March 1890 – 4 August 1952) married Melveene Vera "Queenie" Maughan (1891 – 30 May 1916) He married again, to Kathleen O'Connor ( – ); lived at Cranbrook Avenue, Millswood Estate.

- Flt-Lt. Philip Edward Cawthorne DFC (4 January 1922 – 5 April 1945) was killed when his plane was downed over Germany.

- Cyril Cawthorne (24 September 1894 – 1971) fought with 1st AIF, mentioned in dispatches; married Hilda "Dolly" King ( – ) on 27 July 1931, lived at Dulwich then Seaview Road, Henley Beach.

- daughter (1 July 1937 – )

- Frank Roy Cawthorne (16 December 1899 – 1985) married Mary Cooper ( – ) on 25 April 1925, lived at 14 Culross Avenue, Fullarton

- Peter Charles Thomas Cawthorne (29 May 1926 – )

- Alfred Ngadlu Cawthorne (20 September 1856 – 25 October 1897) married Johanna Roach (c.1858 – 4 March 1936) on 21 September 1885

- Lily Cawthorne (8 October 1887 – 7 September 1937) married Alfred James Ollivier (17 November 1886 - 6 March 1937)

- Florence Wodlalla Cawthorne (25 May 1862 – 1 May 1932) lived William street Brookvale, New South Wales. She never married.
- Harry Cawthorne (24 August 1864 – 22 December 1887) died from typhoid fever.
- Augustus Cawthorne (24 April 1867 – 6 March 1880)
- Ada Cawthorne (5 February 1872 – ) married (1) Ernest Taylor ( – 30 March 1899) on 23 May 1898 (2) Gardner (perhaps organist George Gardner, Mus. Bac.)
- Constance Vera Cawthorne (1891 – 16 June 1940)
- Marjorie Lucy Cawthorne (1893–1979) married Thomas Shakespeare "Guy" King in 1919
