= Harold S. Parsons =

Harold Stephen Parsons (20 August 1885 – 8 January 1973) was a South Australian cellist and organist.

== Career ==
Parsons was born in Nairne, South Australia, son of Stephen Parsons. Theirs was a musical family: his father was an accomplished violinist and his mother an excellent pianist. Other members of the family played flutes and violins and Parsons was encouraged by neighbour C. J. Stevens to take up the cello, and began training with Thomas Grigg and Hermann Kugelberg.

He began teaching at the Adelaide Conservatorium in 1907; twenty years later he was only exceeded in seniority by I. G. Reimann, Frederick Bevan, and T. H. Jones.

On 28 April 1928 a complimentary benefit concert for Parsons was held at the Adelaide Town Hall. Performers included most of Adelaide's professional musicians, and the highlight of the concert was the first performance of a composition for cello and orchestra by Gerald Walenn, who was a violin teacher at the Elder Conservatorium 1917–1924. The concert was opened with a duet by Parsons, playing a 1765 instrument by Giovanni Battista Gabrielli, and Miss Maude Puddy on violin.

He acted as director of the Conservatorium for six months after the death of E. Harold Davies in 1947.

Parsons was also an accomplished organist. He was given the privilege of opening the newly refurbished instrument at Prospect Methodist Church in 1968.

He retired from the conservatorium in 1954.

== Family ==
Parsons married Helen Kate Wreford (1883 – 19 May 1937) on 3 December 1910. Miss Wreford was a teacher of the 'cello at the Elder Conservatorium. Her father Henry Wreford (c. 1837 – 25 November 1917) was a senior employee of James Marshall & Co. and a leader of Methodism in Adelaide. Their children include Helen, Mary, Henry and John.

- Henry Wreford Parsons (5 June 1918 – 19 January 1942) was an RAAF pilot, killed in action over Malaya but listed as "missing" for five years. He married Dorothy May Lucas on 20 July 1940.

He married again, to Ellie Bertha Strempel (died 18 May 1971) in 1938

== Recognition ==
The National Library of Australia holds a collection of cuttings related to Parsons.
