= W. K. Gold =

Australian painter and art society administrator

Walter Kelvington Gold (c. 1847 – 16 February 1895), generally referred to as W. K. Gold, of South Australia, was a painter remembered for his brief but effective period as secretary of the South Australian Society of Arts, Adelaide's premier art society.

== History ==
Gold was a son of Charles Emilius Gold and Eleanor Felicia Askin Geddes. His father, Charles, was an officer of the 65th Regiment who'd served in the First Taranaki War, New Zealand, as well as an artist of limited ability.

He was employed by the South Australian Government Survey Department from 1876 to 1895 and was a member of the Adelaide Art Circle from 1890 to its end in 1892, then hon. secretary of the South Australian Society of Arts from 1892 ("its resuscitation", for which he has been largely credited) to shortly before his death in 1895.

In both his secretarial duties and artwork he was described as perceptive, quick, meticulous, painstaking and having an excellent memory for details. In personal dealings he was courteous and a good friend. His remains were buried at the West Terrace Cemetery.
