= Harold Smyrk =

Australian-born British diver

Personal information
- Born: September 16, 1889; Melbourne, Australia
- Died: November 10, 1956 (aged 67); Sydney, Australia

Sport
- Sport: Diving

Harold Nelson Smyrk (16 September 1889 – 10 November 1956) was an Australian diving champion who represented Great Britain at the 1908 Olympic Games in London.

== History ==
Smyrk was born in Melbourne, where his father Herbert Moesbury Smyrk (1862 – 3 June 1947) was a stained-glass artist, a partner with one Charles Rogers as Smyrk & Rogers. The partnership dissolved in September 1888, and the family left for Adelaide to work for painter and decorator E. F. Troy (c. 1855–1910) of Gawler Place and Flinders Street. He would later, as "Herbert Moesbury", achieve a little fame as a writer, Beardsley-esque illustrator and traveller with a special fondness for Tahiti. For four or five years, they lived in the seaside suburb of Glenelg, which boasted a large marine swimming pool. His father was a good swimmer, and Harold an apt pupil, and soon became quite proficient, but diving, particularly the high dive, was where he excelled.

The family left for London around March 1898, to the regret of members of the Adelaide Easel Club, of which his father had been an active member. but a year later his imminent return to Australia was reported, his father having apparently not enjoyed the acceptance he had been hoping for. His mother, Laura Elizabeth Smyrk, died in 1902.

They didn't return to Adelaide, but Sydney and Smyrk joined the South Sydney Swimming Club, winning numerous diving championships. and in 1903 moved to England, residing at Kingston-on-Thames, and Smyrk joined the Cygnus Swimming Club. In 1905 he won a silver cup presented by Sir Claude de Crespigny.

Smyrk, who was several times remarked on for his diminutive size, represented Great Britain in diving at the 1906 Olympiad at Athens, and the 1908 Olympic Games in London, but failed to reach the finals.

Smyrk returned to Australia, and by 1915, he was a resident of Glenelg, where he started a diving club in 1918. While in Adelaide he was active in swimming organizations, and was a competitive golfer.

Smyrk married Ivy Powell of St Peters, South Australia on 31 December 1916; they lived in Adelaide until around 1930 and divorced in Sydney in 1933.

In 1951 he had a cottage on The Esplanade, Warringah, Sydney.
