= Thomas Grigg (musician) =

Australian violinist and conductor

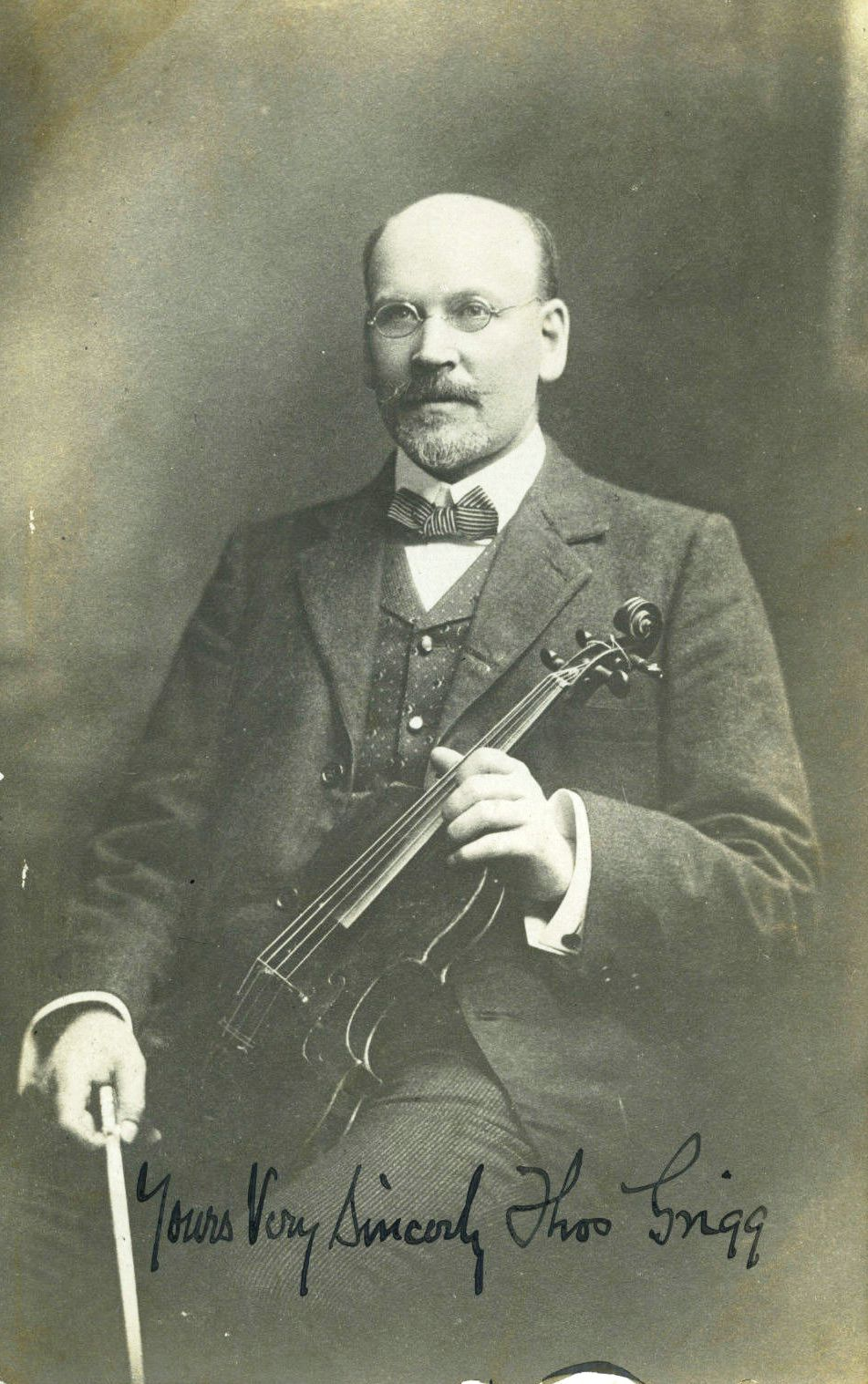

Background information
- Born: 28 August 1859
- Died: January 1944 (aged 84)
- Occupations: musician; teacher; conductor
- Instrument: violin

Thomas Grigg (28 August 1859 – January 1944) was a South Australian violinist, teacher and conductor.

== History ==
Grigg was born in Teignmouth, Devon and arrived in South Australia around 1878.

He furthered his musical education under Hermann Heinicke at Gotthold Reimann's Adelaide College of Music (founded 1883), which became the Elder Conservatorium.

He was a tutor with W. R. Knox's South Australian College of Music (founded 1895) at Priest's Buildings, off Flinders Street, whose staff also included T. H. Jones, Edward Howard, Lucy Stevenson, Evelyn Goss, Professor Macully, F. Bellizia. He taught many string players, notably Harold S. Parsons, Harry Hutchins and Mrs. C. W. Chinner. He taught violin at the Methodist Ladies' College around 1905.

He frequently appeared as a featured soloist or in duets at concerts, and was a member of the popular Adelaide String Quartet.

He was for 28 years a member of the permanent orchestra attached to the Theatre Royal, served as leader and in 1893 or earlier became its conductor.

He was conductor of the Adelaide Orchestral Society which, under management of Charles Cawthorne, regularly gave concerts in aid of prominent causes, notably 26 annual benefits for Minda Home, held at the Exhibition Building. During the Great War he performed in support of various patriotic causes.

He was nominated one of the 15 notable musicians of South Australia of the late 19th and early 20th centuries: Frederick Bevan, Charles Cawthorne, E. Harold Davies, J. M. Dunn, Thomas Grigg, Hermann Heinicke, John Horner, E. H. Wallace Packer, Harold Parsons, W. R. Pybus, I. G. Reimann, William Silver, C. J. Stevens, Oscar Taeuber, Arthur Williamson.

== Family ==
Thomas Grigg married Rachel Ellen Worthley (1859 – 17 October 1913) on 7 July 1879, had a home at 19 Robert Street North Unley. They had five daughters, none of whom married and mostly lived in the family home:

- Etta Jane Worthley Grigg (25 July 1880 – 5 January 1945) was a fine viola player; taught and appeared on stage with her father. She was a foundation member in 1936 of the Adelaide Symphony Orchestra, sponsored by the ABC. She never married, died in Adelaide.
- Mary Elizabeth Grigg (1882–1886)
- Mabel "May" Grigg (1885–1969) was a painter, known as May Grigg. She studied under Hans Heysen, painted portraits. She won the Melrose Prize in 1921 for a portrait of her father, and took the prize again the following year. May Grigg later served as senior art mistress at Ballarat Technical Art School until 1945 when she returned to teach at the South Australian School of Arts and Crafts. The State Library of South Australia has a self-portrait by May Grigg.
- Nellie Grigg (5 October 1888 – 1969)
- Edith Grigg (26 March 1890 – 18 September 1916)
