= Adelaide Easel Club =

Adelaide art club (1882–1901)

The Adelaide Easel Club was a society for South Australian painters which broke away from the South Australian Society of Arts in 1892 and which re-merged with the parent organization in 1901.

== History ==
The club was founded in November 1892 when a group of Adelaide artists broke away from the Society of Arts, (Note: The South Australian Society of Arts succeeded the South Australian Academy of Arts, another asserts that the South Australian Society of Artists was a later form of the South Australian Academy of Arts.) formulating a set of rules, one of which was that members must submit a sketch at each meeting based on a subject nominated at the previous meeting, and which would be shown to fellow members. (Note: Students at the School of Art formed the "Adelaide Sketch Club" along similar lines fifteen years earlier.) The first subject was "Solitude".

Foundation members included "Jimmy" Ashton, Alfred Scott Broad, Edward Davies, C. Harrie Gooden, Andrew MacCormac, C. C. Presgrave, (Note: Charles Cave Presgrave (16 December 1863 – 28 February 1897) was a clerk with the Savings Bank. He married Elsie Maude Bleechmore on 30 April 1895; they had one son, Kenneth Cave Presgrave (17 March 1896 – 1976)) G. A. Reynolds, J. Shakespeare, "Alf" Sinclair and his brother "Joe" Wadham, John White, and E. J. Woods. Half of those named were also members of H. P. Gill's Adelaide Art Circle, which folded around this time, after less than two years' existence. Later members included Paris Nesbit, Jimmy Saddler, Oscar Fristrom, Hans Heysen, Hayley Lever, Herbert Smyrk (Note: Smyrk was best known for his stained glass work for E. F. Troy.) and Marie Tuck.

Club meetings were at first generally held at the studios of Wadham & Sinclair, Colonial Mutual Building, King William Street, but occasionally at James Ashton's art school and studio in Norwood, later at their own premises, 62 Rundle Street (Fritz & Bernard's Art Palace or Fruhling's studios; later the site of the York Theatre)

The first president was W. J. Wadham, followed in 1896 by James Ashton. Secretary was C. C. Presgrave until his death in 1897, followed by J. H. Gooden.

The Adelaide Easel Club merged with the Society of Arts in 1901. The Chief Justice, Sir Samuel Way was closely involved with both organisations.

== Exhibitions ==
The club held its first exhibition at the Old Exchange Building, Pirie Street in May 1893. Exhibiting artists included Wadham, Sinclair, Ashton, MacCormac, Presgrave, Maude Wholohan, Miss E. Crane, Miss Bloxam and Frank H. Bartels.

The club's 1893 Autumn Exhibition was held at the Old Exchange room, Pirie Street. One painting which drew the critic's attention was by portraitist Andrew MacCormac, entitled "Bush Artist". It depicts R. H. Shaw "on the wallaby track", presumably to sketch an Aboriginal encampment, a genre for which Shaw was well known.

The 1894 Exhibition was held in the Jubilee Exhibition Building, North Terrace. Exhibitors included Wadham ("our premier artist"), Ashton, Reynolds, Bartels, Gooden, Presgrave, White, J. S. Gold, R. Büring, C. Siemer, Fred Burford and C. F. J. Crampton. In August 1894 an exhibition of oil portraits by Oscar Fristrom was mounted at the Easel Club rooms, including a portrait of well-known Adelaide personality Poltpalingada Booboorowie, a.k.a. Tommy Walker, which was bought by Sir Edwin Smith for the National Gallery of South Australia.

In 1895 exhibitors included Wadham, Sinclair, Ashton, Gooden, Presgrave, White, Oscar Fristrom, Miss Crane, C. Siemer, Edward Davies, Alf Scott Broad, Rose MacPherson, Miss E. Richards, Mrs Wholohan, Mrs Lermitte,

In 1896 exhibitors included Ashton, Wadham, Sinclair, Miss J. L. Wilson, Mrs Le Freeman, Smyrk

In 1897 exhibitors included Ashton, Davies, G. A. J. Webb, White "the Kent Town chemist", Jean L. Wilson, Miss Wholohan, Hans Heysen,

In 1898 exhibitors included White, Ashton, Broad, Davies, Gooden, Heysen, Sinclair, Wadham, Blanche Francis, Arthur Millbank, Jean Wilson, Mrs E. B. Bartlett, Miss Elvira von Bertouch, Miss C. Blundstone,

In 1899 exhibitors included White, Davies, Heysen, Ashton, Barnes brothers, Reg. Comley,

The last exhibition, (held 1900 in the old Institute Building, North Terrace) exhibitors included Ashton, White, Davies, Comley, Miss Jean L. Wilson, Chris Seimer, H. S. Power, Miss B. Davidson, Miss Oliphant, John Gow, Miss F. Pike, Mrs Wholohan, Miss May James, Miss Tuck, Mrs Gee, L. Beaglehole, Miss Ada Egan, Miss Benham, Miss Winnie Kelly.
