= Frederick Bevan =

English-Australian singer and music pedagogue

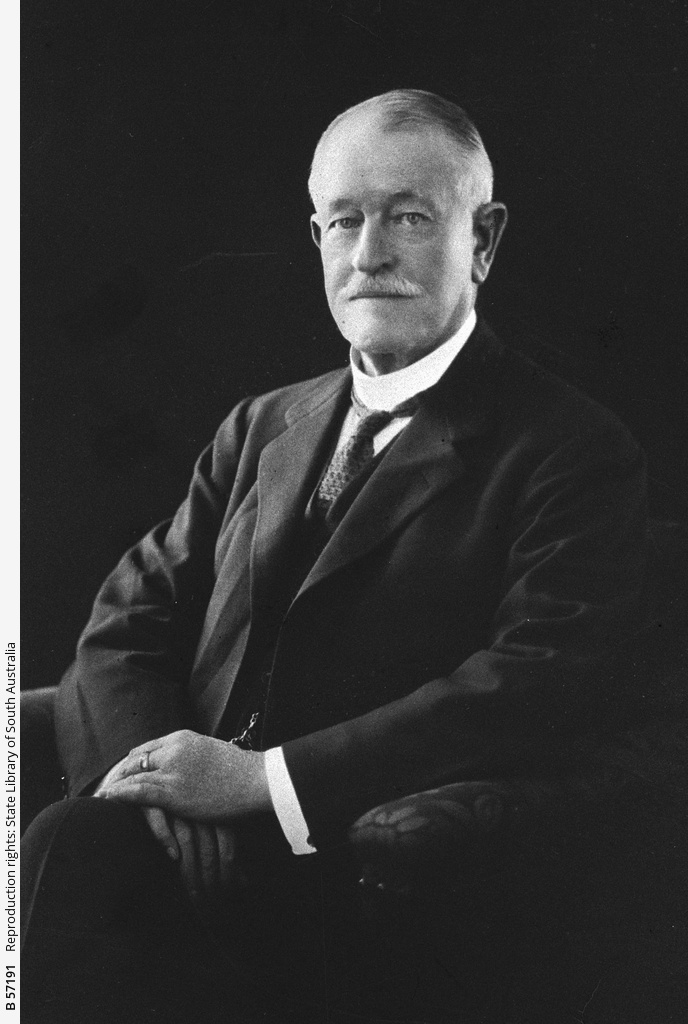

Background information
- Born: 1856
- Died: 27 March 1939 (aged 82–83)
- Occupations: voice teacher and songwriter
- Instruments: voice organ

Frederick Charles Bevan (1856 – 27 March 1939) was a singer and songwriter in England remembered as a teacher of singing in South Australia.

== History ==
Bevan was born in London, and began his musical career as a chorister and one of the chief soloists at All Saints, Margaret Street, London. He was also a member of the choir of St. Martin's, Haverstock Hill, and of St Margaret Pattens, and of the Henry Leslie and Joseph Barnby choirs. He studied the organ under C. Willing and W. S. Hoyte, and after further voice training was appointed Gentleman of the Chapel Royal, Chapel Royal, Whitehall, in 1878, later receiving an appointment at the Chapel Royal (St. James's Palace) in 1888. He held appointments as assistant lay vicar of Westminster Abbey, and vicar choral at St Paul's Cathedral. He was also well known as a songwriter with an output of more than 100 songs, a number of part songs and anthems.

In 1898 he accepted an appointment as teacher of singing at Adelaide's Elder Conservatorium. The London Musical Times reported on the farewell dinner given to him on 25 April at St. James's Restaurant by 150 members of the musical profession, where he was presented with a book of signed autographs of those present, which he kept as a precious memento. He arrived in South Australia aboard Oruba in June 1898.

He was the first singer to appear on the stage of Elder Hall.

He was conductor of the University Choral Class from its inception to 1898. Among his students were Hilda Sincock, Hannah Marritt, Muriel Cheek, Mrs A. H. Morphett, Max Fotheringham, Raymond Bermingham, and Maurice Chenoweth

In those days singing masters at the conservatorium were entitled to a large percentage of the students' fees. So great was his popularity as a teacher that Bevan was the highest paid employee of the university.

He retired from active teaching at the Conservatorium in 1935.

(As adjudicator of choral contests) A man of strong personality, autocratic, calm, and efficient, his manner convinced the competitors that he was not one to be trifled with, and his decisions were received with due respect. ... he possessed a retentive memory and was a brilliant raconteur ... a most entertaining companion.

His remains were buried at the North Road cemetery, Nailsworth, where a memorial records the names of his wife and son Reginald, also one F. P. Bevan and M. C. Bevan, which from the dates may be son Percival and Reginald's twin brother or sister, who most likely never left Britain.

=== Other activities ===
- He was an authority on the work of Arthur Sullivan, and gave well-attended lectures on the subject at the Adelaide Town Hall.
- Bevan gave a large number of choral performances in the city.
- He officiated as organist and choirmaster for 20 years at the North Adelaide Congregational Church.
- He acted as adjudicator at the Ballarat Eisteddfod on several occasions.
- Shortly after the death of his wife, Bevan donated a valuable Christopher Barker 16th-century New Testament to the State Library.

=== Compositions ===
Among his 100 songs, were the popular ballads:

- "The Flight of Ages",
- "The Admiral's Broom",
- "The Sailor's Sweet-heart",
- "The Mighty River",
- "Peg Away",

and anthems:

- "Sing Unto God Ye Kingdoms of the Earth".

=== Bibliography ===
- Bevan, Frederick (1921), The Life and Works of Sir Arthur Sullivan, G. Hassell & Son

== Recognition ==
- The Frederick Bevan Prize Scholarship was offered to young singing students from 1952.
- A newspaper nominated him as one of the 15 notable South Australian musicians of the late 19th and early 20th century: Frederick Bevan, Charles Cawthorne, E. Harold Davies, J. M. Dunn, Thomas Grigg, Hermann Heinicke, John Horner, E. H. Wallace Packer, Harold S. Parsons, W. R. Pybus, I. G. Reimann, William Silver, C. J. Stevens, Oscar Taeuber, Arthur Williamson.

== Family ==
Frederick Bevan (1856–1939) married Louisa Ann Agnes Muirson (1853 – 7 February 1934)

- F. Percival Bevan (24 October 1880 – 3 January 1953)
- Reginald John Bevan (1882 – 26 November 1942) married the widow Bertha Louise "Birdie" Kaestner née Hoffman (perhaps Elisabeth Bertha Luise Hoffmann or similar) ( –1975) on 8 August 1912. (Paul Gustav Kaestner died 1908, married Bertha Luise Hoffman in 1903)
  - Clifford Reginald Bevan (1914–1973) was a fine organist and player of the French horn.

They had a home on 241 Melbourne Street, North Adelaide.
