= George Whinnen =

South Australian painter (1891–1950)

George Whinnen (30 November 1891 – 7 November 1950) was a South Australian painter.

== History ==
He was born in Gawler, South Australia, a son of John and Emily Whinnen, née McIntosh (died 1923). After attending the local primary school he secured a job with A. C. Follett & Co., drapers of Murray Street, Gawler. He showed an interest in painting, so his uncle F. B. Whinnen, a Murray Street grocer, made him a gift of a set of paints.

His family moved to Willaston, then to Broken Hill, where he worked for Don Tailors and took night classes in painting at the technical school. He took further classes at the East Sydney Technical School. He was a champion rifle marksman, winner of the Galway Cup. When he left Broken Hill for Adelaide around the end of 1924 a trophy for rifle marksmanship was named for him. A few years later he was able to make art his full-time occupation. He studied under Fred Britton and attended life classes at the Adelaide School of Art.

He won the Melrose Prize for portraiture in 1929 and 1932, also won prizes for landscapes and seascapes, much of which was painted around Victor Harbor.

He created a furore in 1940 when he removed a still life from an exhibition run by the R.S.A.S.A. in a protest against the judges. He was president of the Royal South Australian Society of Arts 1940–1950. Also in 1940 he was appointed by the Education Department as teacher of drawing and painting from Life and Still Life.

The South Australian Museum commissioned him to paint a diorama for a major display of Central Australian wildlife.

His Still Life and Autumn Flowers were once held by the Art Gallery of South Australia.

== Family ==
George Whinnen married Gladys Hill Pearce (1891 – 8 December 1953) on 19 August 1919; they had three daughters:

- Diana (1920–1929)
- Jeanette (26 November 1922 – 8 June 2005) married Hugh Butterworth on 3 November 1951
- Anne (23 September 1931 – ) married Richard Fidock 29 March 1952

They had a home at 5 Rowell Avenue, Glenunga

== Selected Gallery ==
Selected works of George Whinnen.

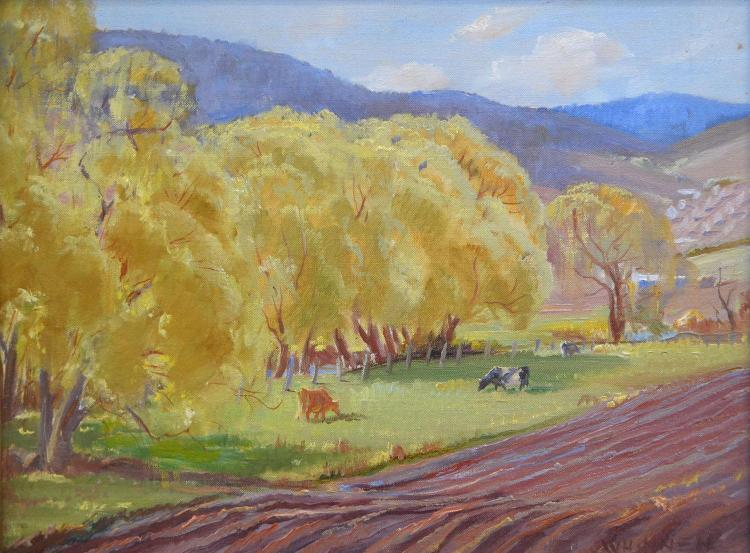
George Whinnen, LANDSCAPE WITH CATTLE, OIL ON CANVASBOARD

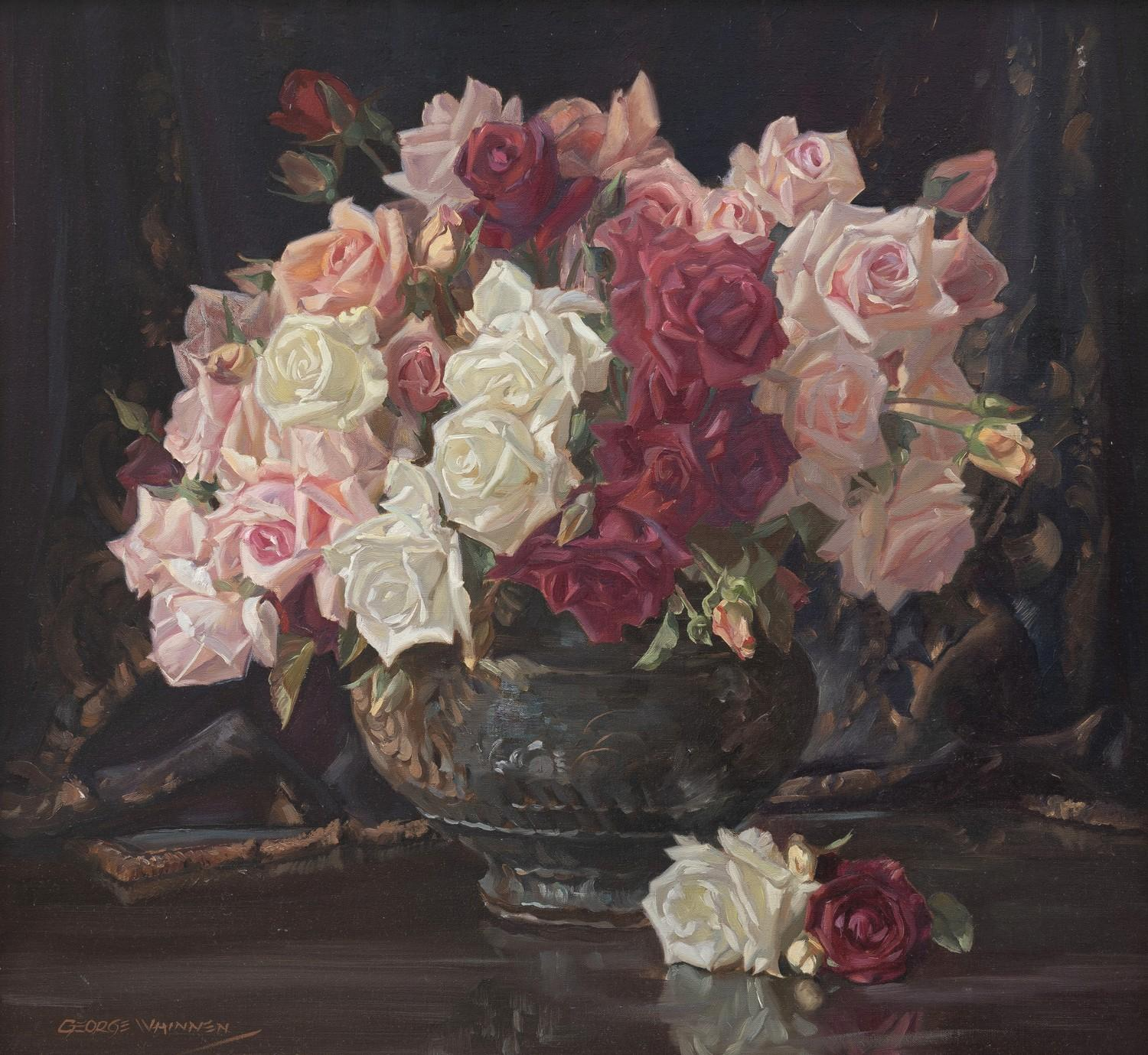
George Whinnen - Roses oil on canvas

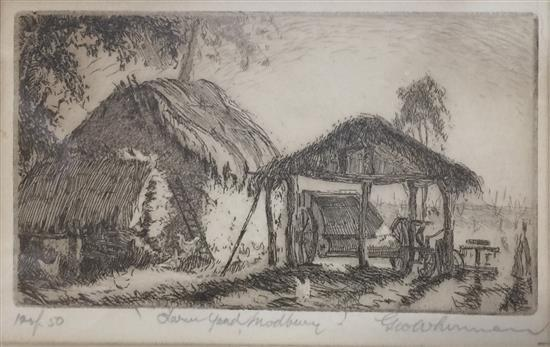
George Whinnen - Farm Yard Modbury Etching

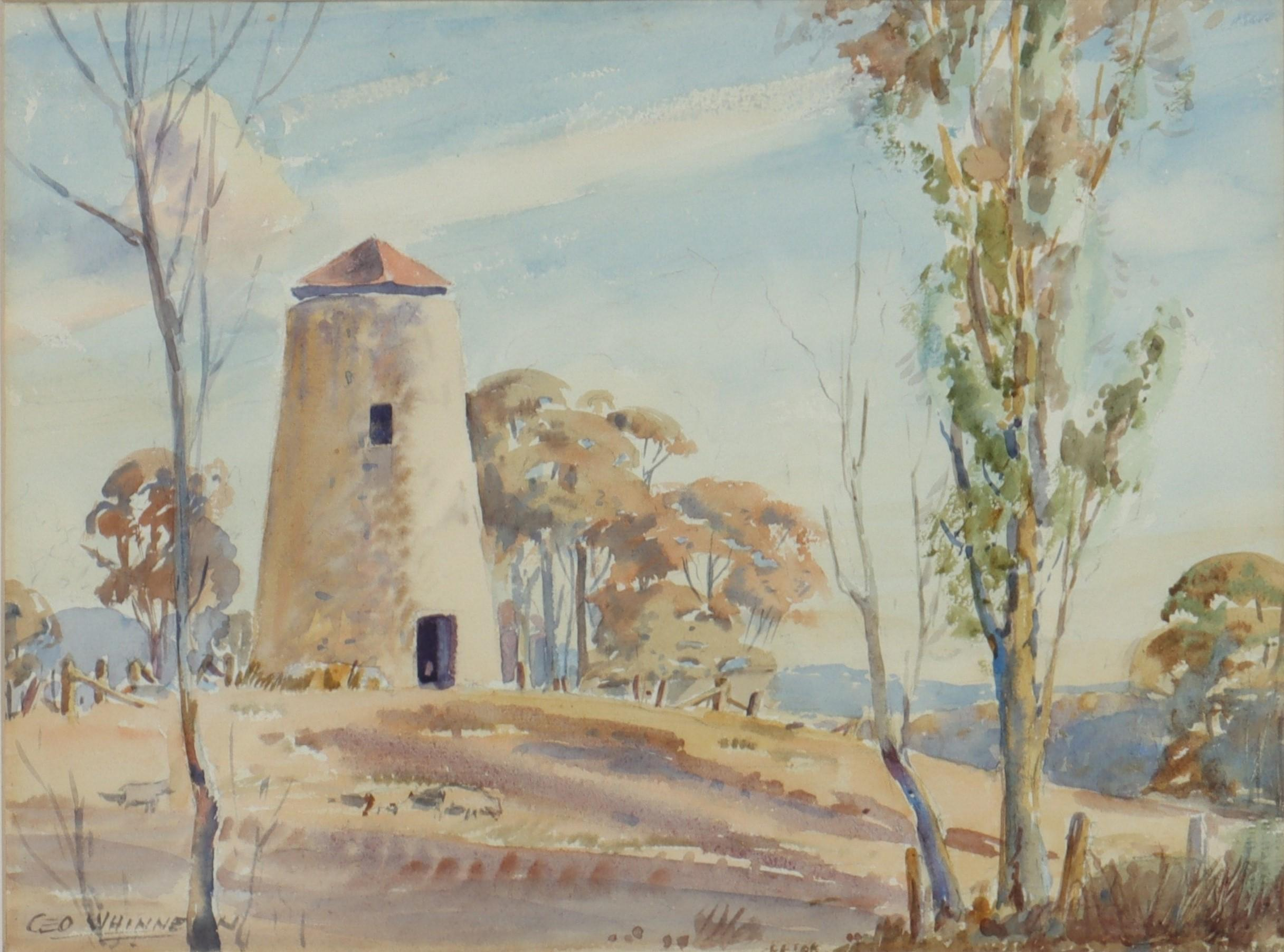
George Whinnen - Old Mill, Mount Barker SA, Watercolour

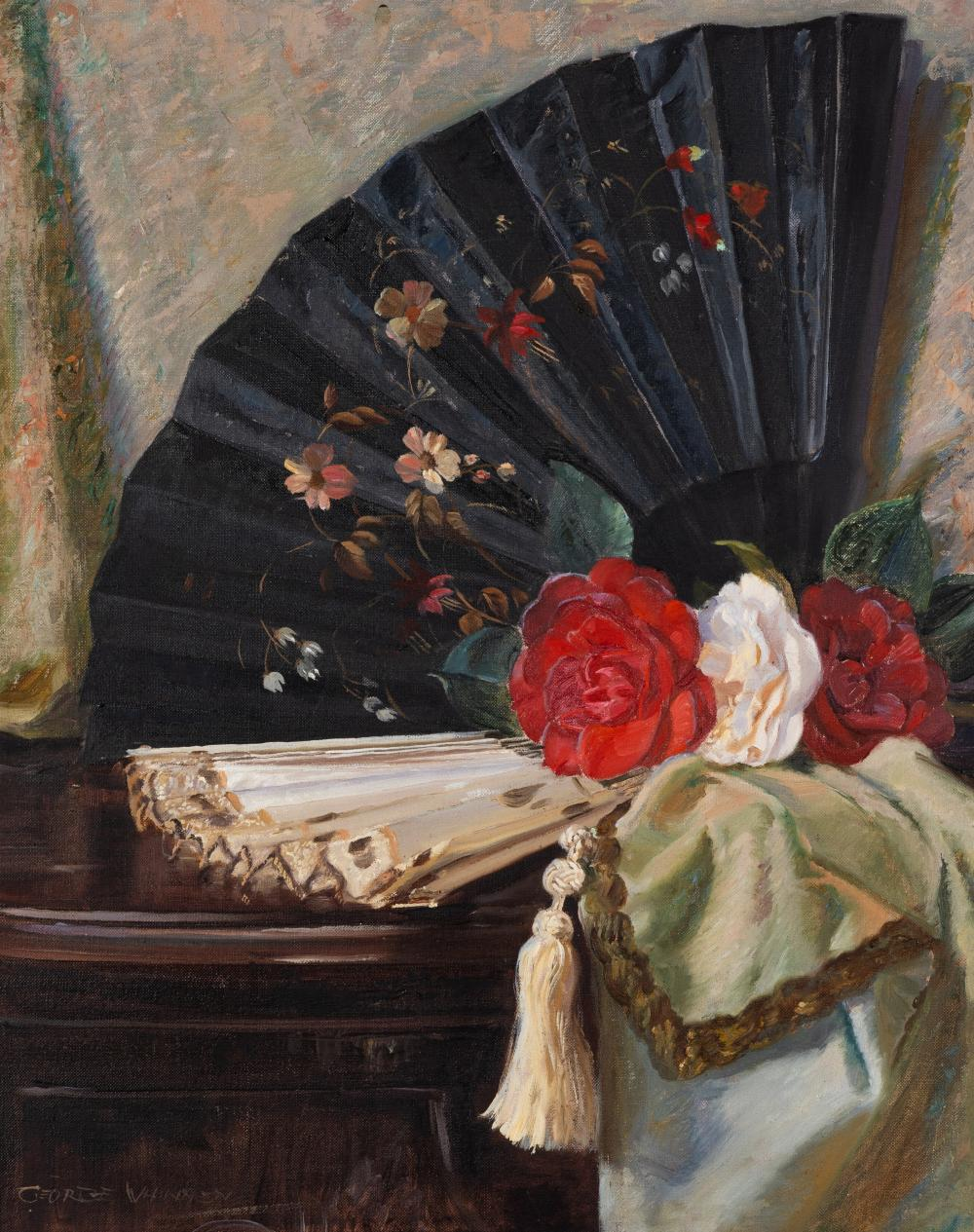
George Whinnen - The Black Fan oil on canvas
