= Alfred Scott Broad =

Australian painter (1854–1929)

Alfred Scott Broad (1854 – 27 April 1929) was an Australian artist, regarded as the first black-and-white artist born in South Australia to be published. He was known as "Alf", and was often referred to as "A. Scott Broad" as though his surname was "Scott-Broad", and was often written that way. An adult daughter was the subject of an unsolved mystery disappearance.

== History ==
Alf was born in Adelaide a son of James Broad (c. 1830 – 14 June 1895) coachbuilder then music warehouseman and organ builder, who arrived in South Australia on the Osceola on 4 April 1851.

Alfred Scott Broad, Figures by a river.

He studied at the South Australian School of Art and contributed drawings to Adelaide Punch from 1868, and The Lantern (later Quiz and The Lantern) from 1874 to 1890. He set up a studio in his father's organ-building workshop on the corner of Gilles and Hanson streets. He was principal illustrator for The Portonian from 1871 to 1879. He moved to Melbourne, where he contributed to Australasian Sketcher, the Frearson brothers' Illustrated Australian News and Melbourne Punch. He was appointed to the staff of Illustrated Sydney News.

He returned to South Australia, and contributed to Frearsons' The Pictorial Australian from 1886. He was in 1892 a founding member of the Adelaide Easel Club.

The Art Gallery of South Australia has a watercolor by Alf Scott Broad: The First Stone House erected in South Australia, depicting George Bates's house on Kangaroo Island, painted in 1887. and a print Glenelg, Holdfast Bay, S.A. 1837 from c. 1880.

He ran an import business.

== Family ==
James Broad ( – 1895) was married to Ann Matilda Broad, née Scott (c. 1825 – 14 August 1905): they had a residence "Trevethan House" on Hanson Street, Adelaide, from 1865 or earlier. Their family included:

- John James Broad (1852 – 1 March 1933), organ builder, married Elizabeth Rogers (1854 – 31 December 1928) on 25 March 1875. Their eldest son, Alfred Scott Broad (1876– ), not to be confused with the subject of this article, married Nellie Nora Dyer on 24 December 1903 Their younger daughter Edie Muriel Broad (1887 – 7 October 1948) married A. E. "Gus" Cawthorne (c. 1887 – 15 July 1937), musician and noted businessman, on 25 March 1912; they lived at Ningana Avenue Kings Park
- Alfred Scott Broad (1854 – 27 April 1929), artist and subject of this article, married Emmeline Fanny Ray ( – 27 October 1933) of Melbourne on 12 June 1884. She was an artist herself, and author of The Sex Problem; In 1912 they had a home "Helmsdale" in Glenelg; his last address was 6 Kintore Avenue, Prospect.

- Wilfred Ray Broad (1885 – 30 December 1952) was a mining engineer and metallurgist at Broken Hill. He married Marie McGrath (ca 1884 – 9 October 1930) of Nowra on 27 December 1915. He married again, in 1933 or 1934, to Beatrice Annie "Trixie" Lock ( – 10 January 1935), killed in a car crash at Molong, New South Wales. His third wife Florence survived him.
- Elsie Broad (1891– )
- Hilda Scott Broad (1893– ) disappeared from their Glenelg home in May 1913, and was never heard from again.
- Mavis Lillian Broad (1896 – ) was a musician; featured in several Boy Scout functions in 1918. She married Andrew Rankin of Kensington on 3 June 1933, divorced 1941.

- Edwin Broad (1856 – March 1927), manager of the Adelaide Telegraph Department married Phoebe Eliza Webb (c. 1862 – 24 October 1939) of Mount Gambier on 9 January 1883; they lived at Edith Street, Unley Park then 6 Rutland Ave. Unley Park. Their elder daughter Ethel Marguerite Broad (1887– ) married George R. Best ( – ), son of Sir Robert Best, on 27 December 1915.
- Arthur Charles Broad (17 July 1858 – 9 July 1936) of the city treasury married Esther Maud "Ettie" Carthy (27 Mar 1862 – 9 July 1930) on 9 November 1882.
- Matilda Jane Broad (1860–1935)
- Fred Scott Broad (23 May 1865 – 9 January 1927), photographer and noted lawn bowler, married Mary Jane Tonkin ( – 24 July 1935) on 13 June 1887. They had a home, "The Boulevard", Hawthorn, Victoria.
- William Henry Peers Broad (10 July 1867 – ) married Helen Dove "Nellie" Low (c. 1856 – 9 February 1926) on 13 January 1892, lived at 9 Cambridge Terrace, Kingswood. Their son Ivan Charles Broad (1897– ) was a pioneering motorist.
