= Harry Pelling Gill =

Australian artist and teacher (1855-1916)

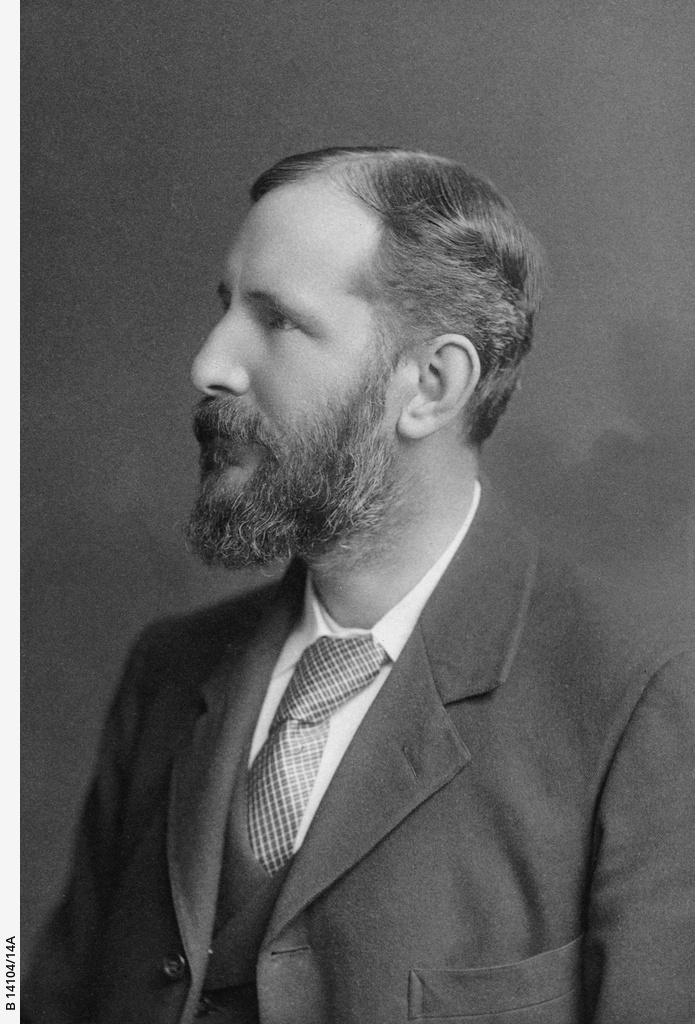
- Born: March 9, 1855; Brighton, Sussex, England
- Died: May 25, 1916 (aged 61); At sea, between Marseilles and Gibraltar, aboard the steamer Mongolia
- Education: South Kensington School of Art (National Art Training School); Brighton School of Art
- Occupations: Art curator, art educator, painter
- Years active: 1877–1915
- Employer(s): Public Library, Museum and Art Gallery of South Australia (1882–1909); Adelaide School of Art (1909–1915)
- Known for: Curatorship of the Art Gallery of South Australia
- Spouse: Annie Waring Wright (m. 1886)
- Children: Lancelot Waring Gill; Erold Waring Gill
- Elected: President, South Australian Society of Arts (1892; 1909–1911)

Harry Pelling Gill (9 March 1855 – 25 May 1916), commonly referred to as H. P. Gill or Harry P. Gill, was an English-born Australian art curator, teacher and painter, who spent most of his career in Adelaide, South Australia. As honorary curator of the Art Gallery of South Australia from 1892, and master of its School of Design from 1882 to 1909, he shaped both the gallery's early collection and the training of a generation of South Australian artists.

== Background ==
Gill was born at Brighton, Sussex, England, the son of Alfred Gill and his wife Frances Elizabeth, née Pelling. Gill studied at the Brighton, Hove and Sussex Grammar School, the Brighton School of Art, and at the South Kensington School of Art (National Art Training School), where he gained a scholarship in 1877.

== Career ==
=== School of Design ===
In 1882 Gill was appointed Master of the School of Design at Adelaide, selected by the Board of Governors of the South Australian Institute. In 1909, the responsibility for art teaching was transferred to the Education Department and the school became the Adelaide School of Art, with Gill as Principal and Examiner. Gill brought with him the South Kensington system of art education, which entailed copying with great exactitude. He organised courses ranging from elementary to advanced art and trade instruction, including correspondence lessons for students outside Adelaide.

=== Art Gallery of South Australia ===
Gill was appointed honorary curator of the Art Gallery of South Australia in 1892, following the resignation of Louis Tannert, whose separate role as Master of the School of Painting was merged into Gill's own.

After the pastoralist Sir Thomas Elder left the gallery a bequest of £25,000 in 1897, Gill pressed for a substantial part of it to be spent on contemporary work by living Australian and international artists. In 1899 he travelled to England and the Continent with a committee of fellow artists, purchasing works before moving on to New Zealand where an international exhibition of pictures was being held, and made further purchases for the gallery on the board's behalf. Gill also contributed to the design of the gallery's new building, which opened in 1900, and compiled its first official catalogue in 1903.

In 1907 questions were raised in the South Australian Parliament about the sale of artworks through the School of Design. A subsequent board of inquiry found no impropriety, though it judged Gill to have been "somewhat injudicious".

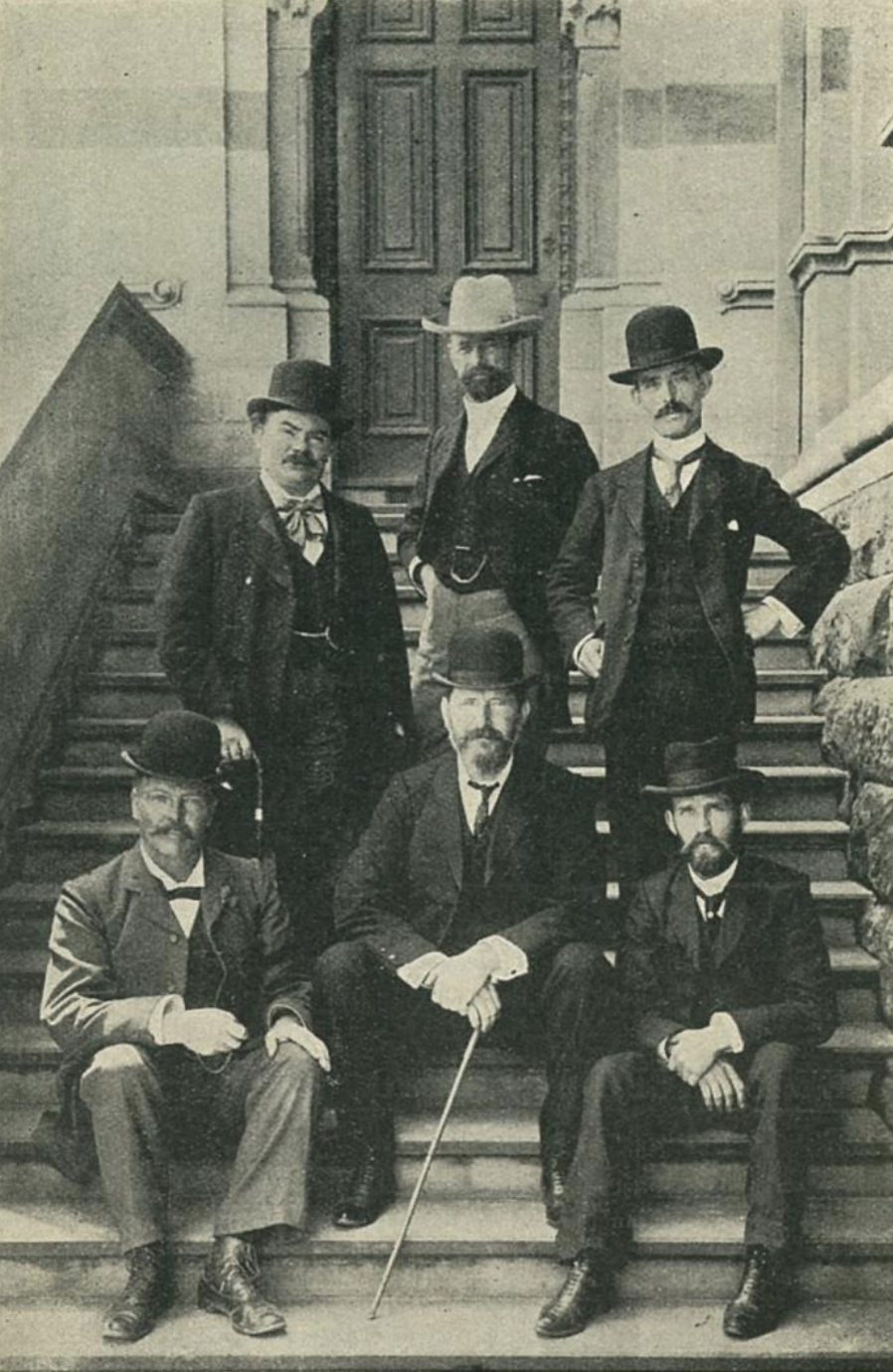
South Australian Society of Arts Selection and Hanging Committee of 1902 - Mr Harry P Gill (Chairman), Messrs J. White, J Ashton, Edward Davies, J Keene and H.E. Powell (Hon.Sec)

=== Adelaide Art Circle and South Australian Society of Arts ===
He founded the Adelaide Art Circle in early 1890 as an exclusive club, limited to 12 members and restricted to professional artists. It held several exhibitions that were clearly dominated by Gill's work and was dissolved in 1892. In June that year, Gill took on the presidency of the moribund South Australian Society of Arts, with most of the committee positions taken by members of the Circle. This marked a revival of the Society's fortunes. Later that year a split in the Society resulted in the formation of the Adelaide Easel Club. Gill went on to serve as the first president elected from among the Society's fellows, from 1909 to 1911.

== Later life and death ==
Gill's health began to decline around 1914, and a period of leave in Britain did not restore it. He resigned as principal of the Adelaide School of Art from 1 July 1915, and suffered a further stroke that September. In April 1916 he and his wife sailed for England aboard the steamer Mongolia, in the hope that the voyage would improve his health. He died at sea between Marseilles and Gibraltar on 25 May 1916, aged 61.

== Legacy ==
Gill was a Freemason and an Associate of the Royal College of Art. The Art Gallery of South Australia holds a self-portrait by Gill and a 1907 portrait of him by Millicent Hambidge, as well as an oil painting and three of his watercolours. A medal in his name is awarded by the South Australian School of Art.

== Publications ==
Gill, Harry P. (Harry Pelling); School of Design Art Club (Adelaide, S.A.) (1894), The straight and devious paths of studentship : a lecture delivered at the School of Design, Adelaide, on Friday, 9th February, 1894 / by Harry P. Gill, School of Design Art Club.

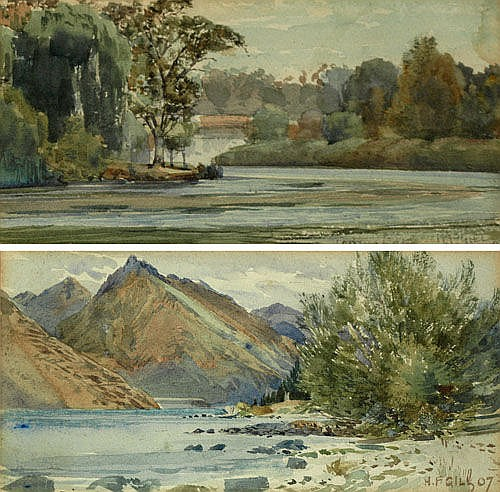
Torrens Lake and Landscape, c. 1907

== Family ==
Harry Pelling Gill married Annie Waring Wright, a granddaughter of T. S. O'Halloran, on 29 April 1886. They had two sons:

- Lancelot Waring "Lance" Gill (22 August 1887 – 31 December 1969), married Isabel May Moore on 24 December 1912. Isabel was the third daughter of S. W. Moore MLA for NSW.
- Erold Waring Gill (21 May 1891 – 25 July 1916) He died of wounds received during the Somme Offensive.
