= Marshall & Sons =

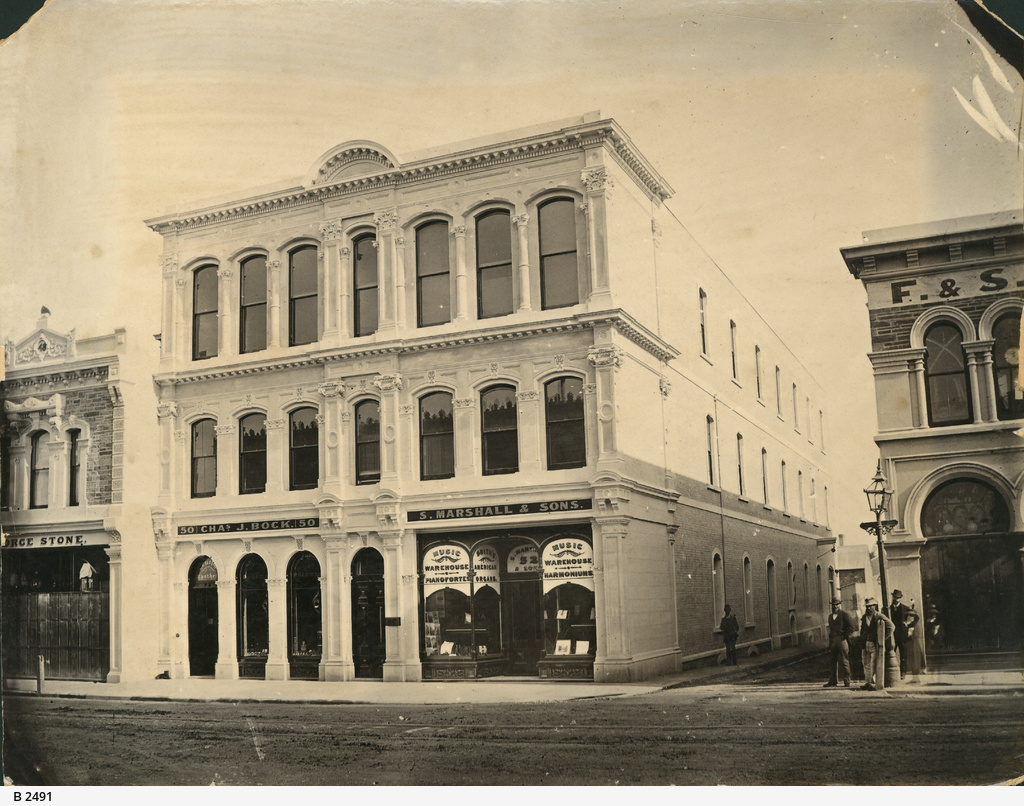
S. Marshall and Sons at 52 Rundle Street, north side, corner of Gawler Place, Adelaide, South Australia.

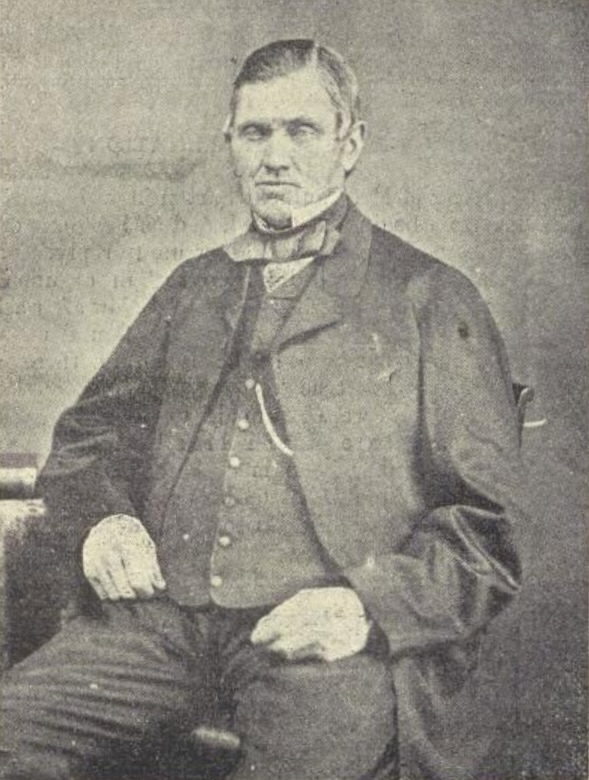
Samuel Marshall

S. Marshall & Sons were music retailers in Adelaide, South Australia.

== History ==
Samuel Marshall (15 June 1803 – 28 March 1879) emigrated to South Australia on the Thomas Harrison, arriving in February 1839, one of the first ships after the First Fleet of South Australia. He was trained as an organ-builder, but realising there would be little call for such skills in a pioneering colony (apart from assembly of a small pipe organ for a Mr Richman, and another for St John's Church in 1848), applied his ingenuity and dexterity to other mechanisms. He not only developed a reaping machine in competition with John Ridley's, but helped Ridley in the production of his pioneering machine.

In 1850 he set up a shop in Currie Street (the site of the later Adelaide Steamship Buildings) where he sold harmoniums and other musical instruments, later moving to 52 Rundle Street, at the corner of Gawler Place, extending to North Terrace. That building was demolished in 1879, and a new three-storey building erected in its place, with a lift operating between basement and top floor.

In 1875 his sons Alfred Witter Marshall (31 October 1850 – 16 December 1915) and John Myles Marshall (14 May 1854 – 6 May 1877) became partners in the firm, and John travelled to England to learn techniques of piano-making at the factory of Pohlmann & Son, in Halifax, Yorkshire. John however died quite young, followed closely by his father. Harold Witter Marshall (7 May 1874 – 20 November 1953) joined his father in the business in 1891, and became sole proprietor in 1917. He served an apprenticeship in London for some years with Chappell & Co. Myles Witter Marshall (1907 – 23 March 1987) joined his father's business around 1925.

In 1856 Samuel Marshall built a pipe organ for the Archer Street Wesleyan Church, and, the story goes, he was responsible for Rev. Maughan settling in South Australia rather than Victoria: the two met in a dramatic fashion in mid-ocean, when their respective ships linked up to exchange provisions and passengers were free to circulate between the two ships and Marshall met Maughan and persuaded him where his vocation lay. Marshall was certainly at the forefront in the foundation of his church.

The Marshall Music Rooms in Rundle Street hosted a good number of overseas artists: Madame Patey, Charles Santley, Signor Foli, Mademoiselle Dolores, and the Sheffield Choir, as well as up-and-coming local artists like Maude Puddy and Percy Grainger. Marshall & Sons established the Adelaide Music Association in 1886 with Charles Joseph Stevens as conductor and organist.

Harold Marshall was also of assistance to established South Australian organists T. H. Jones, Professor Ives, Dr. E. Harold Davies, J. M. Dunn, I. G. Reimann, Hermann Heinicke, T. Grigg, F. Bevan, E. E. Mitchell, and A. R. Mumme.

The earliest record of any pipe organ in this State was in 1839, when a Mr. John Richmond who purchased property at Prospect, brought out an organ and placed it in his home called Prospect House. The next reference is in 1846, when an organ was built in South Australia by one Samuel Marshall. Incidentally Mr Marshall began making reaping machines in 1839: then in 1846 he started to build a pipe organ. The organ was temporarily erected in the Pulteney Street School, and later on a gallery in the old St John's Church, the organ and gallery costing £300. The opening of the organ look place in July, 1848, the organist on this occasion being a Mr Bennett, who was at that time a business associate of Mr Marshall.

The wealthy Richmond, for a time partner of John Primrose, built on the later site of Graham's Castle, and had Marshall assemble the pipe organ he brought out from England. It was later installed in Christ Church, North Adelaide.

== Family ==
Samuel Marshall (15 Jun 1803 – 28 March 1879) married Jane Myles (21 December 1816 – 7 November 1879) around 1847. She was his second wife, and the oldest sister of Charles Myles MP (1837–1903).

- John Myles Marshall (14 May 1854 – 6 May 1877) married Martha Elizabeth Beare (c. 1852 – 25 December 1941) in 1876. She married again, to William John Kennedy in 1880 and had three more daughters and a son.

- Jeanie Elizabeth Myles Marshall (28 June 1877 – 25 December 1909) was at one stage a promising contralto.
- Lucy Isabel Marshall (11 October 1880 – )

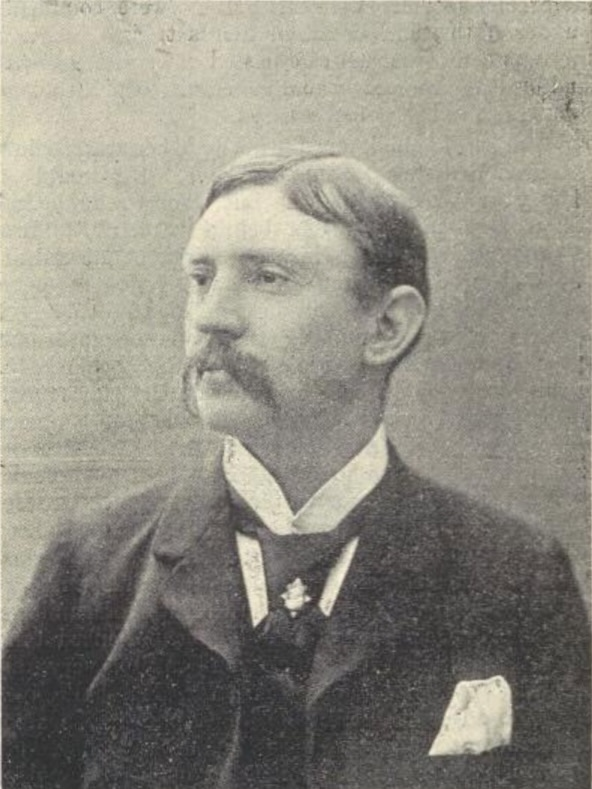
- Alfred Witter Marshall in 1897
  Alfred Witter Marshall (31 October 1850 – 6 December 1915) married Louisa Hornabrook Martin (14 January 1851 – 26 January 1935) on 14 February 1873

- Harold Witter Marshall (7 May 1874 – 20 November 1953) married Elsie Clevedon Knowles (24 March 1876 – 17 June 1956) on 12 December 1890.

- Myles Witter Marshall (1907 – 23 March 1987)

- Millicent Hornabrook "Millie" Marshall (18 June 1875 – ) married Harry Johnson (25 December 1871 – ) on 5 March 1899
- Amy Louisa Marshall (14 August 1878 – 9 September 1956) married Harry Ernest Meyer on 19 December 1900
- Jane Hilda Marshall (3 December 1880 – 16 January 1922)
- Percy Marshall (6 May 1883 – 19 May 1933) married Esme Florence Ryland ( – 23 February 1966)
- Edna Annie Marshall (6 July 1884 – 13 September 1933) married Eldin Swanzy Moulden (4 January 1883 – 13 August 1919) on 6 June 1906. He was engineer with MTT.
- Eric Marshall (23 August 1888 – 17 June 1927) married Dorothy Martin ( – 15 October 1940) in 1920

== See also ==
- Cawthorne and Co well known competitors
