= Hermann Kugelberg =

German musician

Hermann Kugelberg (1868 – 26 November 1950) was a German cellist and teacher of music in Adelaide, South Australia.

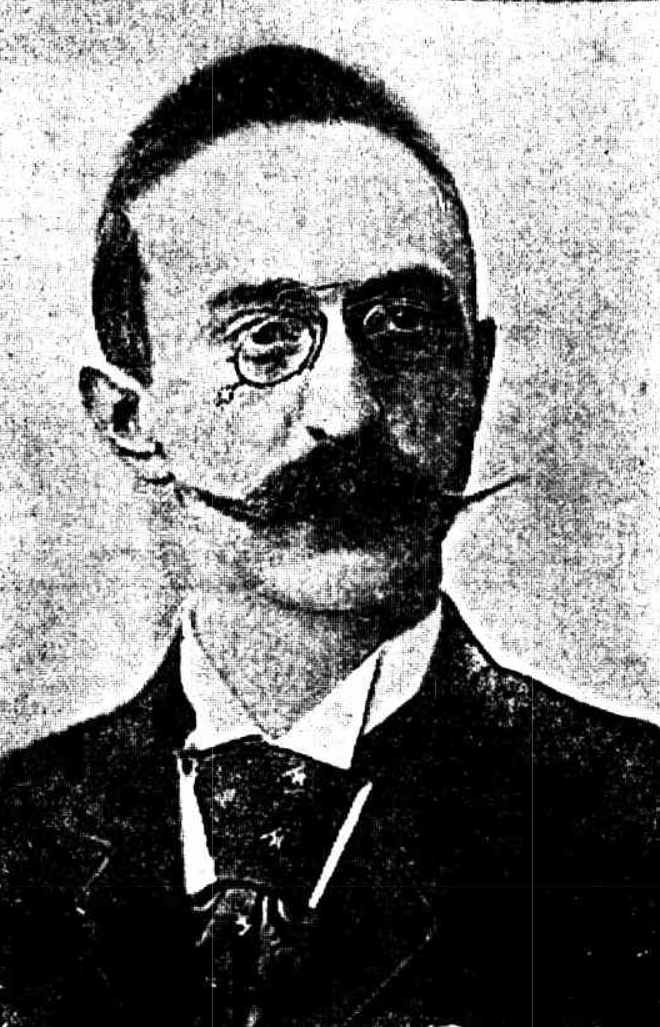
Hermann Kugelberg

Kugelberg was born in 1868 in Hamburg, and received his musical education at the conservatorium that city, his teachers including Herr Gowa and Professor Schroder. His career as a professional musician included sixteen years as solo cellist in the Philharmonic Orchestra at Hamburg, playing under Hans von Bulow and such celebrated conductors as Johannes Brahms, Anton Rubinstein, Joseph Joachim, Leir, (who?) and Felix Mottl.

He was recruited as 'cello teacher by Gotthold Reimann for the Adelaide College of Music, arriving in Adelaide by the SS Darmstadt in 1897, and was subsequently appointed in a similar capacity to the Elder Conservatorium.

His brother was a noted painter in oils.

Harold S. Parsons was a notable student.

In 1906 he resigned his position with Elder Conservatorium, and Parsons, a multiple Elder Scholarship winner, who was in Germany continuing his studies under Herr Hugo Becker at the Hock Conservatorium, Frankfurt-on-Maine was appointed his successor. Parsons was expected to commence his duties in March 1907.

In 1914 Kugelberg was convicted of indecent exposure, on the evidence of several male members of the public.

He died aged 83 at a nursing home in Linden Park, South Australia, and his remains interred at the Dudley Park Cemetery.

== Family ==
Kugelberg was married and had a child, according to the 1897 passenger list of the Darmstadt. His wife was Antonia Kugelberg, invariably referred to as Mme Kugelberg, the singing teacher, whose speciality was improvement of her students' natural singing voice. She died in Melbourne on 15 October 1946, aged 86 years.

Their daughter was best known as Miss Emma Kugelberg L.T.C.L., (Note: Education Department records reveal her full name as Emma Dorothea Matilda Kugelberg.) who attended Adelaide Girls' High School, trained for her Trinity College London Licentiate under Mme Kugelberg, and conducted the Kugelberg Choral Society. She visited Pinnaroo fortnightly to give lessons. She married (Arthur) Eric Watson of Melbourne in 1921 and died on 11 May 1950. They had four children who survived infancy: Spencer, Evelyn, Jeffrey and Francis.
