= Thomas Elder =

Australian politician

Sir Thomas Elder GCMG
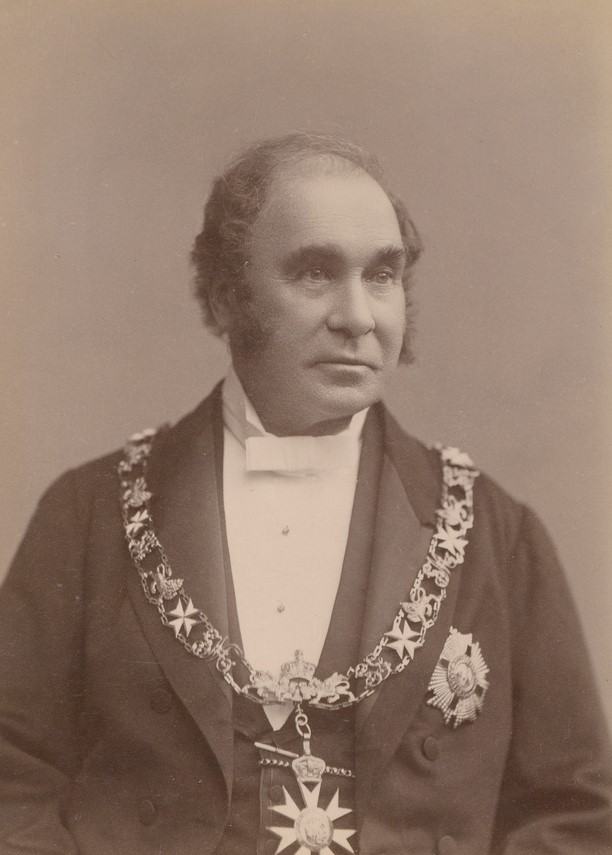
- Elder, c. 1887

Member of the South Australian Legislative Council
- In office 7 August 1863 – 18 March 1869
- In office 4 October 1871 – 1 August 1878

Personal details
- Born: 5 August 1818 Kirkcaldy, Scotland
- Died: 6 March 1897 (aged 78) Mount Lofty, South Australia
- Relations: William Elder (brother); Alexander Lang Elder (brother); George Elder (brother); Robert Barr Smith (brother-in-law)
- Occupation: pastoralist, businessman, politician
- Known for: importing camels to Australia philanthropy

Sir Thomas Elder GCMG (5 August 1818 – 6 March 1897) was a Scottish-Australian pastoralist, highly successful businessman, philanthropist, politician, race-horse owner and breeder, and public figure. Amongst many other things, he is notable for introducing camels to Australia.

== Early years ==
Elder was born at Kirkcaldy, Scotland, the fourth son of George Elder, merchant, and his wife Joanna Haddow, née Lang.

Thomas' second eldest brother, Alexander Lang Elder (1815–1885), went to South Australia in 1839 and founded the firm of Elder and Company in Adelaide. He was joined by his brothers William (1813–1882) and George (1816–1897). In 1846 George and Alex went into partnership with experienced pastoralist W.S. Peter to establish a sheep run they named Warrow Station, located at Coulta near Port Lincoln. In August 1851 Alex was elected a member of the Legislative Council for West Adelaide. He resigned his seat in March 1853, and left South Australia. He settled in London in 1855, and acted as agent for the Adelaide company until 1884, when he and his sons established A. L. Elder & Company. William left Adelaide soon after Alexander, and George left in 1855.

== South Australia ==
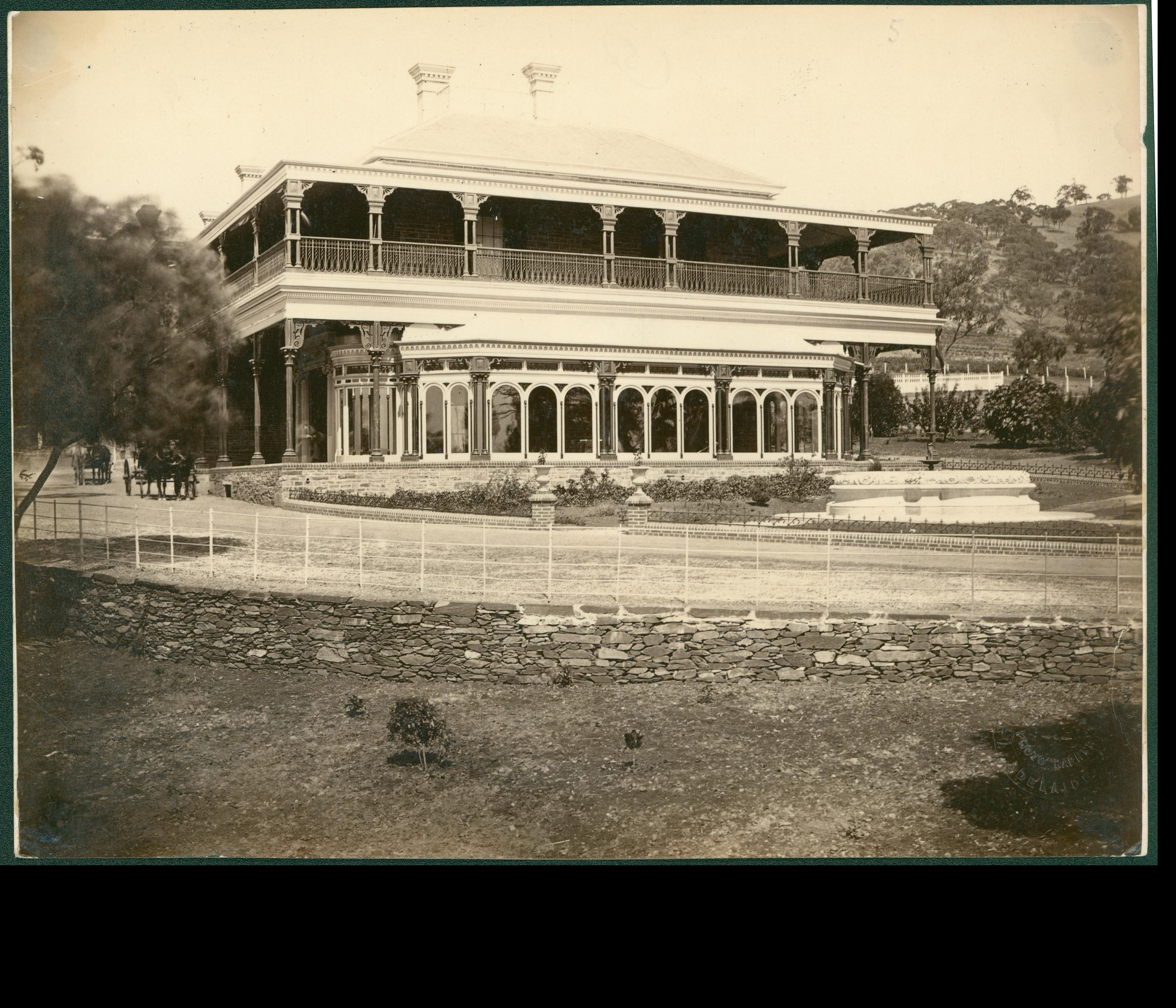
"Birksgate", Elder's house in Glen Osmond, purchased in 1864.

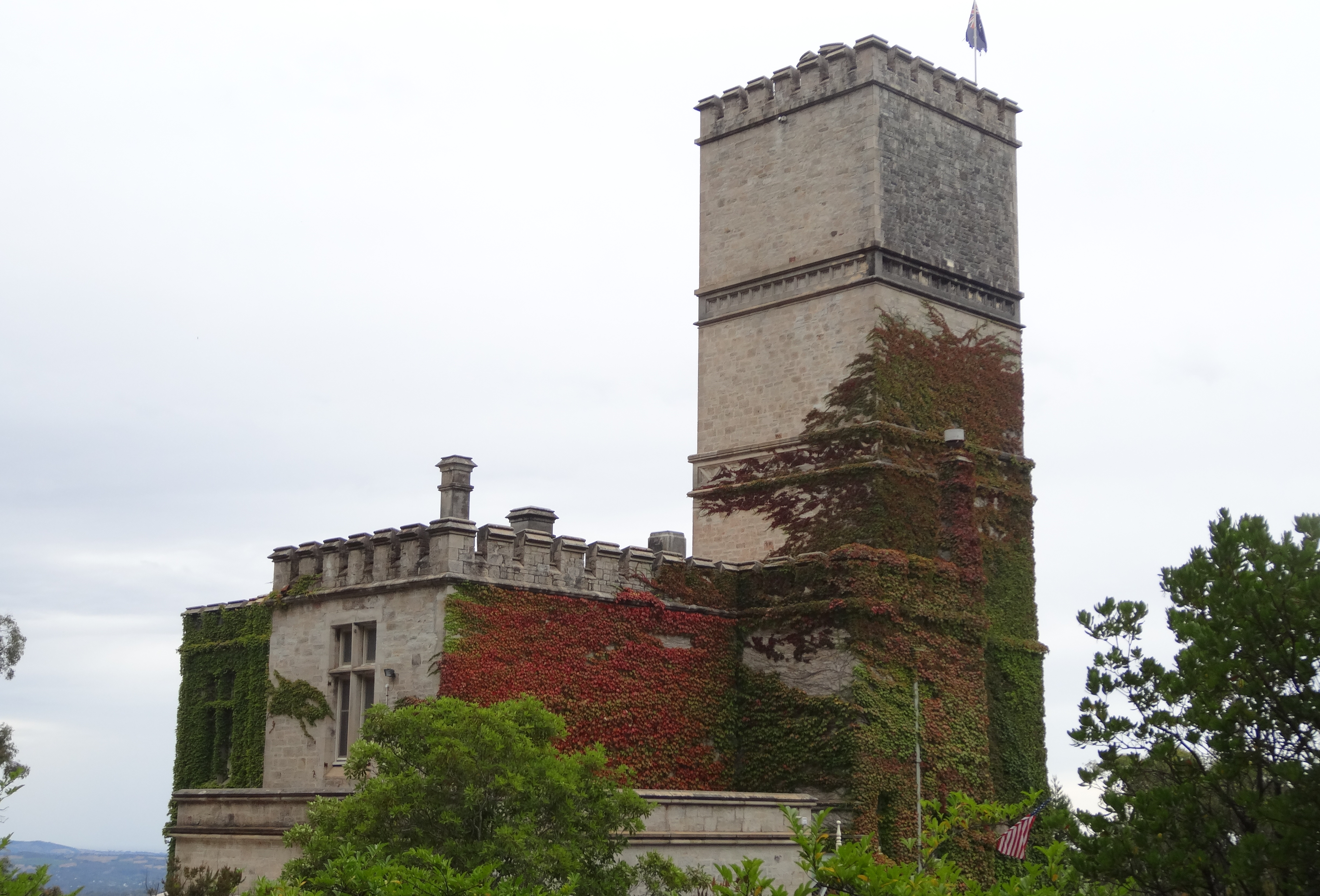
"The Pinnacle", Elder's summer house at Mount Lofty, built in 1885.

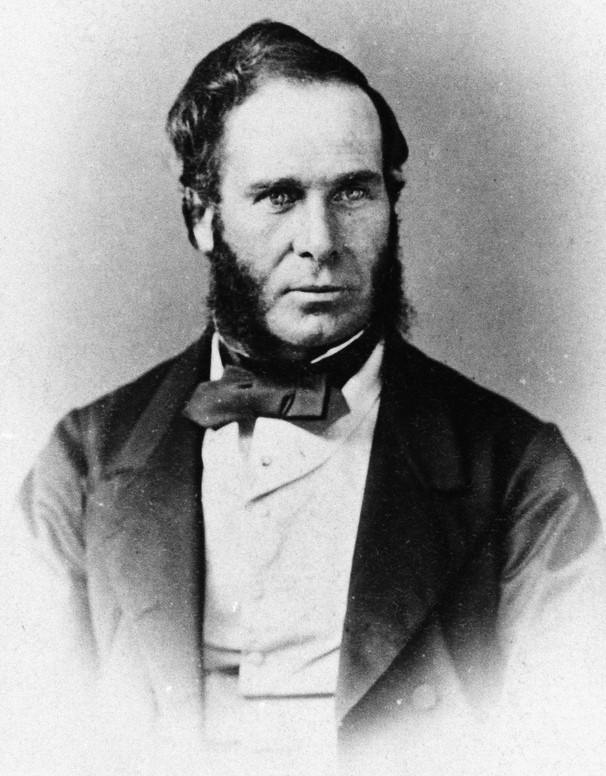
Thomas Elder in 1864

Thomas Elder migrated to Adelaide in 1854 and worked with George for a year. After George departed, Thomas formed Elder, Stirling & Co, a partnership with Edward Stirling, Robert Barr Smith and John Taylor. In 1856 Barr Smith married Thomas Elder's sister Joanna, and on Stirling and Taylor's retirement in 1863, Barr Smith and Thomas Elder formed Elder Smith and Co. In 1875, with Andrew Tennant, they formed the Adelaide Steamship Company.

In 1864 he persuaded Arthur Hardy to sell him his Glen Osmond home "Birksgate", which he developed considerably. In 1897 it passed to his nephew T. E. Barr Smith.

In 1885 he built a summer house in Scottish baronial style, "The Pinnacle", near Mount Lofty. After his death it was sold to John Lavington Bonython, who renamed the property "Carminow".

== Pastoralist ==
Elder also had other important interests. In partnership with Robert Barr Smith, they acquired Nilpena Station in 1859. Other properties Elder acquired during this time included Ketchowla Station, Oulnina, Anabama, Tualkilky, Grampus, Ouratan and Netley. In 1868 he chartered Henry Simpson's Kohinoor to return the "Afghans" and bring out another 60 camels and a fresh contingent of attendants. They became an important factor in the development of the northern area of South Australia. He also established a horse-breeding centre at Blanchetown to supply stock to the Indian market.

== Investor, politician, race horses, vigneron ==
He attended the Paris Exhibition of 1878 as honorary commissioner for South Australia, and during this time he received his knighthood (KCMG).

He was an enthusiastic yachtsman and for many years commodore of the Glenelg Sailing Club.

Elder also had interests in the wine industry and was quite successful in exhibitions in Adelaide and London. He was also a founder of the Tintara Vineyard company in 1862.

== Philanthropy ==
Elder encouraged exploration, contributed largely to Warburton's 1873 expedition and Giles's in 1875, supplying camels in each case, which proved to be of the greatest value. He also contributed liberally to the cost of other explorations such as those by John Ross and the 1891 Elder Scientific Exploring Expedition led by David Lindsay, and in no case sought or obtained any return for himself.

He contributed substantially to the Art Gallery of South Australia's acquisition program. He himself published a small booklet in 1893: Notes from a Pocket Journal of a Trip up the River Murray in 1856, recounting a voyage in the steamer Gundagai.

=== The University of Adelaide ===
In 1874 he gave £20,000 towards an endowment fund for the newly established University of Adelaide, and on his death in 1897 bequeathed a further £65,000 to the university, £20,000 of which was for a School of Music. The Elder Conservatorium of Music perpetuates his name. Elder's combined gifts and bequests to the university amount to nearly £100,000.

==== Elder Professor of Mathematics ====
One of Elder's bequests established and funded the first professorships at the fledgling University; the Elder Professor of Mathematics and Natural Philosophy; and the Elder Professor of Natural Sciences. The first incumbent, Sir Horace Lamb, an applied mathematician, lectured in pure and applied mathematics as well as giving instruction in practical physics. After Lamb's resignation in 1885 to take up a post at Owens College, Manchester, separate Chairs in Mathematics and Physics were established. The Elder Chair of Mathematics at the University of Adelaide has been held by many eminent mathematicians, including Nobel Prize winner Sir William Henry Bragg.

1. Sir Horace Lamb M.A. Sc.D. 1875–1885 (Elder Professor of Mathematics and Natural Philosophy)
2. Sir William Henry Bragg M.A. OM KBE PRS 1886–1908
3. Sir Robert William Chapman M.A. B.E. CMG Kt 1909–1919
4. John Raymond Wilton B.Sc. M.A. D.Sc. 1920–1944
5. Harold William Sanders B.A. M.A. 1944–1958
6. Eric Stephen Barnes B.A.Hons. M.A. Ph.D. 1959–1974
7. Ren Potts B.Sc.Hons. D.Phil. D.Sc. AO 1976–1990
8. Ernie Tuck B.Sc.Hons. Ph.D. 1991–2002
9. Charles E. M. Pearce B.Sc. M.Sc. Ph.D. 2005–2012
10. Mathai Varghese B.A. Ph.D. 2013–

==== Elder Professor of Physics ====
1. Sir William Henry Bragg M.A. OM KBE PRS 1886–1908
2. Sir Kerr Grant B.Sc.(Hons.) M.Sc. KCB 1911–1948
3. Sir Leonard George Holden Huxley M.A. D.Phil. KBE 1949–1959
4. John Henry Carver M.Sc. Ph.D. Sc.D. 1961–1978
5. John Russell Prescott B.Sc.(Hons.) Ph.D. D.Phil. 1982–1990
6. Anthony William (Tony) Thomas B.Sc.(Hons.) Ph.D. D.Sc.1990–

==== Elder Professor of Music ====
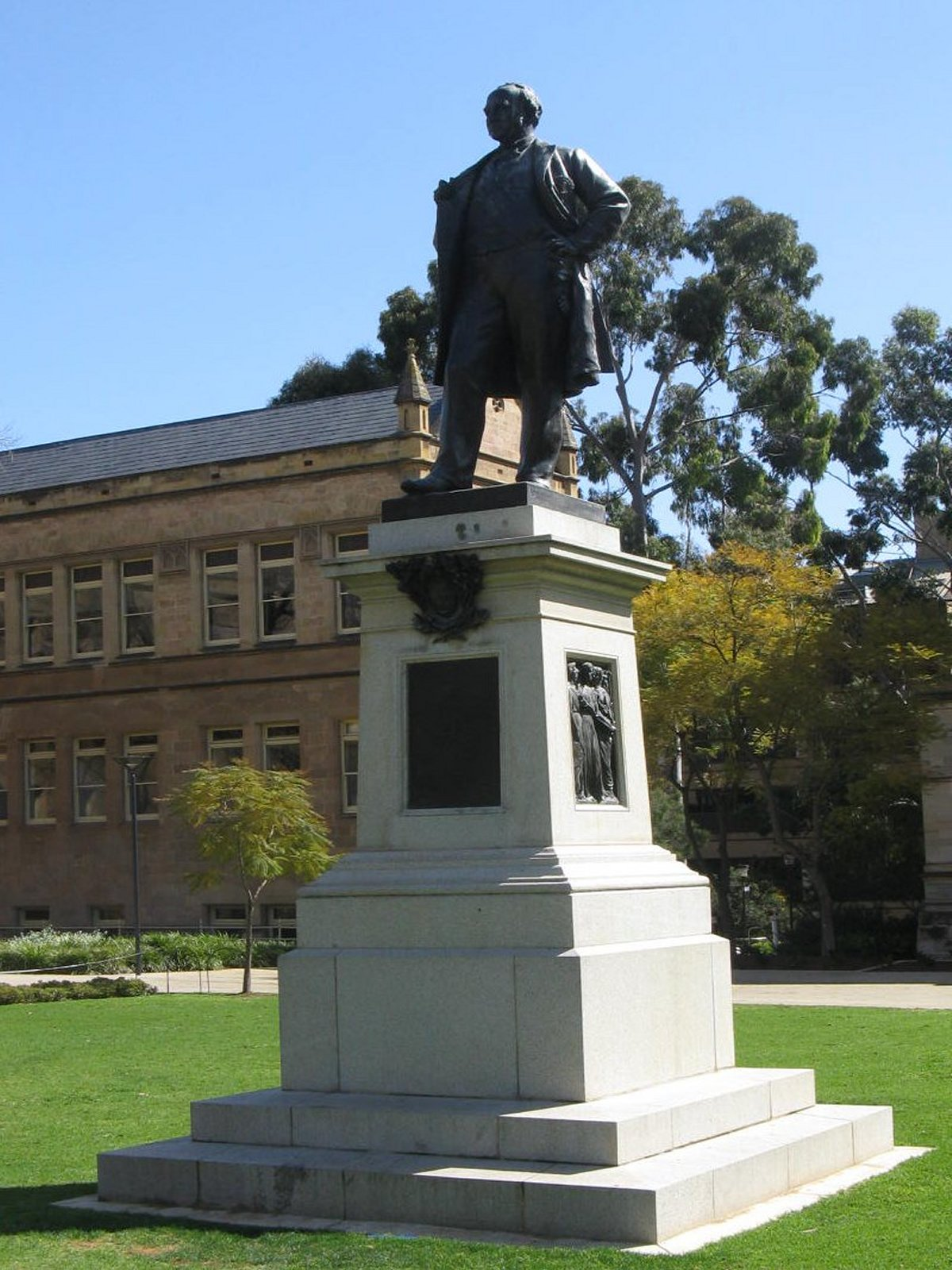
Statue of Elder in front of the Elder Conservatorium

As well as later funding the Elder Conservatorium, Sir Thomas helped to establish the Elder Professorship of Music in 1883, with the first incumbent taking up the post in 1884. At the same time, Sir Thomas established endowment funds in parallel for the Royal College of Music in London and the Music Board of the University of Adelaide to support the Elder Overseas Scholarship (in Music).

All of the Elder Professors of Music have also served as Director/Dean of the Elder Conservatorium, providing artistic and academic leadership both in the Conservatorium and in the Faculties/Schools of Music/Performing Arts of which it has been part.

1. Joshua Ives Mus.Bac.(Cantab.) 1884–1901
2. J. Matthew Ennis D.Mus.(Adel.) 1902–1918
3. E. Harold Davies Mus.Bac. D.Mus.(Adel.)1918–1948
4. John Bishop OBE 1946–1966, pianist and arts administrator
5. David Galliver M.A.(Oxon.) AM 1966–1983, tenor
6. Heribert Esser M.Mus. 1986–1993, conductor
7. Charles Bodman Rae M.A.(Cantab.), DMus(Adel.), Ph.D. D.Mus.(Leeds) 2001–, composer

==== Elder Professor of Anatomy and Histology ====
The first two incumbents of this position were known as the Elder Professor of Anatomy. It became the Elder Professor of Anatomy and Histology on the appointment of Professor Herbert Woollard in 1928.

- Archibald Watson M.D. F.R.C.S. 1885–1919
- Frederic Wood Jones B.Sc. M.B.B.S. M.D. 1920–1927
- Herbert Henry Woollard M.B.B.S. M.D. 1928–1929
- Herbert John Wilkinson B.A. M.B.Ch.B. M.D. 1930–1936
- Frank Goldby M.B.Ch.B. 1937–1944
- Andrew Arthur Abbie B.S. M.D. D.Sc. 1945–1970
- Janis Priedkalns B.V.Sc. M.A. Ph.D. 1972–1996

In 1996 the Wood Jones Professor of Biological Anthropological and Comparative Anatomy, named for the second Elder Professor of Anatomy, was established from an endowment by Professor Ray Last (1903–1993), who studied under Wood Jones in the 1920s before embarking on a successful career as a surgeon and teacher in Australia and the United Kingdom. The foundation Wood Jones Chair (1996–) is Professor Maciej Henneberg Ph.D. D.Sc.

==== Other chairs ====
- Ralph Tate, Elder Professor of Natural Sciences 1875–1901
- Edward Rennie M.A. D.Sc., Elder Professor of Chemistry 1886–1927

=== Other philanthropy and bequests ===
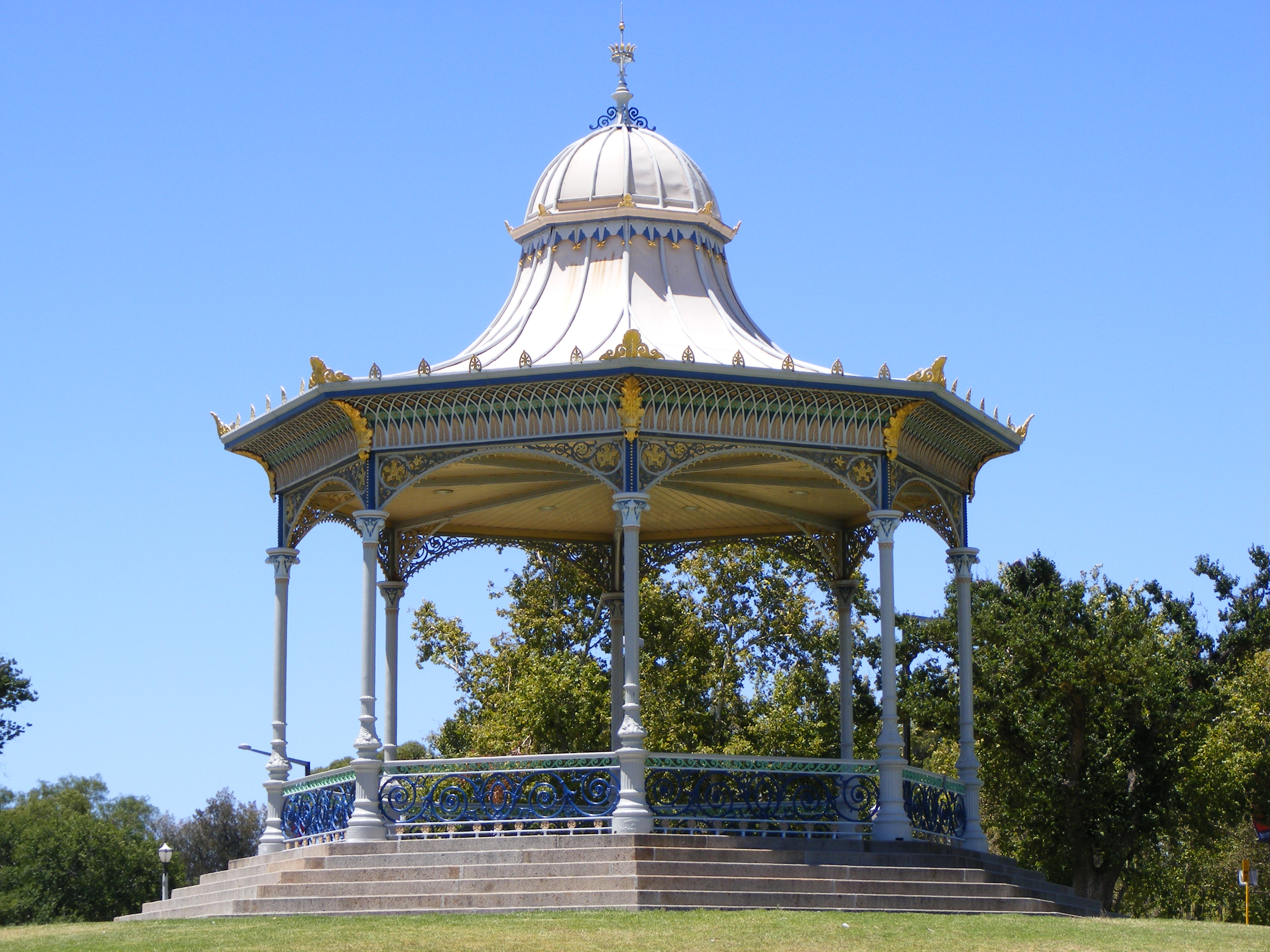
Elder Park Rotunda

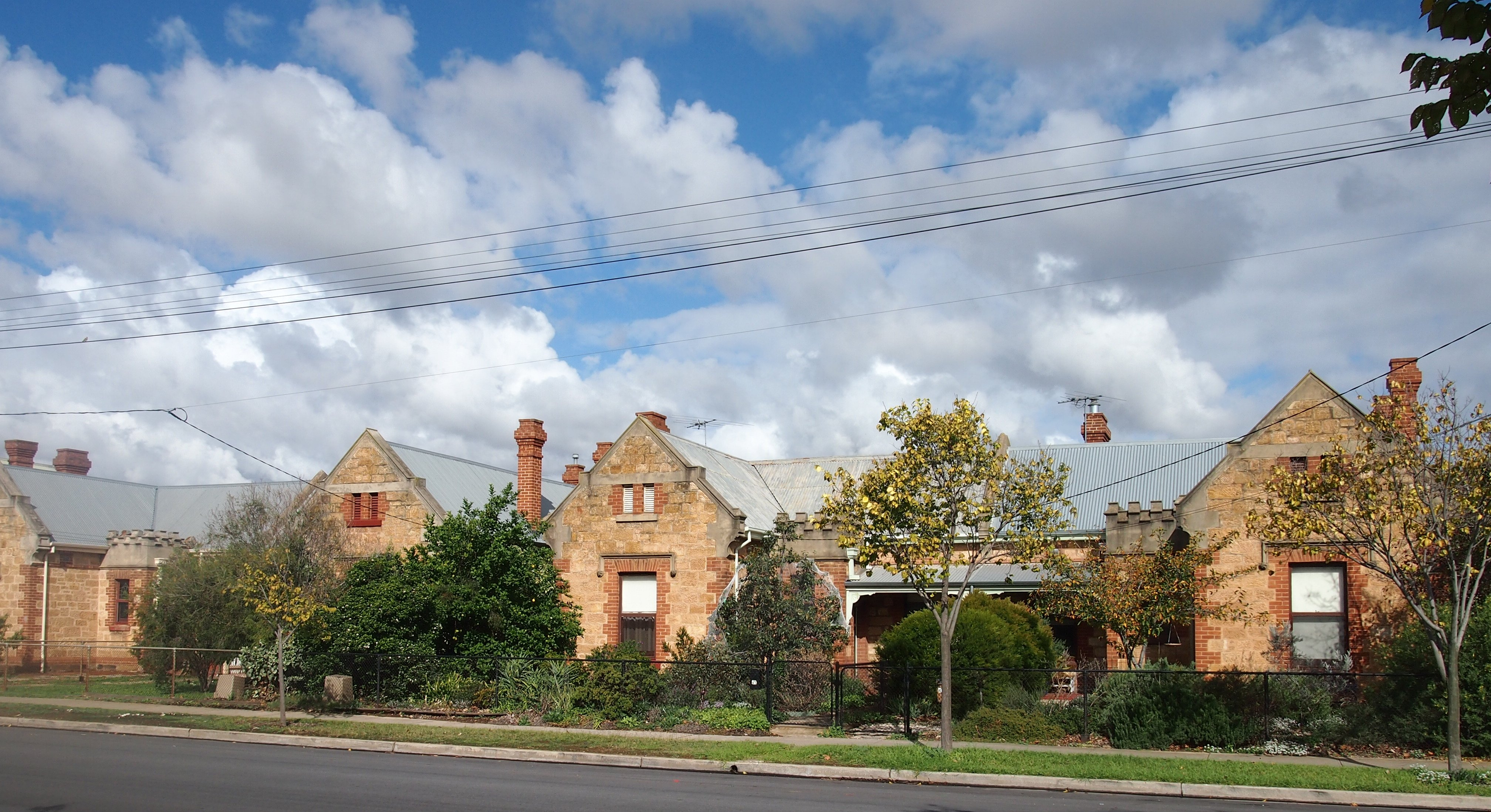
Rose Street cottages built in 1901–02 by Adelaide Workmen's Homes Inc., with Elder's bequest

In 1882, Elder donated the rotunda to Elder Park, which was renamed in his honour in 1907.

In 1884, as president of the South Australian Zoological and Acclimatisation Society, Elder donated the Sir Thomas Elder Rotunda to the society's zoological garden, now the Adelaide Zoo.

On his death in 1897, Elder left a bequest of £25,000 for the construction of affordable homes for 'industrious and deserving' workmen, which led to the foundation of the not-for-profit Adelaide Workers’ Homes Inc. Of the original 48 homes built from 1899 on a site in the Adelaide city centre bounded by Wakefield, Angas and Elder Streets, 13 still remain. Another set of semi-detached cottages in Arts and Crafts style were built in 1901–2, at 36-50A & 39–45A Rose Street, Mile End, and are now state heritage-listed.

During his lifetime and in his bequests, Elder contributed over £170,000 to the Adelaide Benevolent and Strangers’ Friend Society, the oldest secular philanthropic society in South Australia. In 1898 funds from the bequest were used to buy land and construct the society's office at 17 Morialta Street, Adelaide, which was named "Elder Hall" in his honour, and is state heritage-listed.

== Later years ==
He had a severe illness in 1887 and shortly afterwards retired. Elder Smith and Company was formed into a public company, and Elder afterwards lived chiefly in the country. He never married. Elder was knighted in 1878 (KCMG) and created Knight Grand Cross of the Order of St Michael and St George (GCMG) in 1887. He died from influenza at his home, "The Pinnacle", near Mount Lofty, on 6 March 1897, and was buried in the Mitcham cemetery.

== Legacy ==
The Elder Range, adjacent to Wilpena Pound, and its highest point, Mt Aleck, were named after Thomas Elder's brother, Alexander Elder, in 1851.

Lake Elder, a small salt lake east of Lake Frome, is named after Thomas Elder.

Elder is commemorated in the scientific name of a species of Australian gecko, Strophurus elderi.

The South Australian electoral district of Elder is named in his honour.

Elder is mentioned in Jules Verne's 1891 adventure novel, Mistress Branican.

== See also ==
- Elder Conservatorium
- Elders Limited
