= Dudley Park Cemetery =

Cemetery in Adelaide, South Australia

Details
- Established: 1864
- Location: Dudley Park, Adelaide, South Australia
- Country: Australia
- Coordinates: 34.8836°S 138.5821°E
- Type: Public
- Owned by: Dudley Park Cemetery Trust
- No. of interments: >13,000
- Website: Official website
- Find a Grave: Dudley Park Cemetery

Dudley Park Cemetery is a cemetery in Dudley Park, a northern suburb of Adelaide, South Australia.

The cemetery caters for various forms of burial and memorial in different areas. The Caroline Gardens area is based around the former Caroline Square in the original plan for the village of Islington. The square was the site of a Primitive Methodist chapel established in 1845 and its burial ground was established in 1864.

The cemetery was originally known as the Islington Cemetery. In 1922, a letter to the editor of a newspaper noted that the closest railway station to the Islington Methodist Cemetery was the Dudley Park railway station, not the Islington railway station further north. A few years later, the name of the cemetery was changed to Dudley Park at which time it had 900 people buried. In 1936, Dudley Park Cemetery was considered to have sufficient land to operate for at least another 60 years without further extension. Payneham Cemetery was operated by the same Methodist Church board and considered to be filled within a few years.

In 2013, the available space had been filled, and graves were being identified for redevelopment.

The cemetery contains the Commonwealth war graves of nine Australian service personnel, one from World War I and eight from World War II.

Notable people buried at the cemetery include:

- William Henry Cann (1857–1942) Methodist minister
- Maude Mary Puddy (1883–1974) musician
- Arthur Erwin Vogt (1907–1987) Methodist minister and social worker
- Reginald Arthur West (1883–1964) headmaster
