= Elder Scholarships in Music =

Sir Thomas Elder's proposal for scholarships in music performance, tenable at the Conservatorium, was accepted by the Council of the University of Adelaide in 1897. There are five categories of performance for which Elder Scholarships may be awarded each year by the board of the Elder Conservatorium, which entitle the holder to three years' free tuition in their principal subjects and in such secondary subjects as the director of the Conservatorium may approve.

== Elder Scholarship — partial list of recipients ==
=== Piano ===
- 1898: Elsie M. Hamilton

- Maude Mary Puddy — special mention

- 1899: Maude Mary Puddy
- 1902: Florence Olga Schache
- 1908: L. A. H. "Harry" Brose
- 1911: Dorothy Oldham
- when? Ariel Shearer
- 1916: Myrtle Gwendoline Adamson
- 1919: Alice Meegan
- 1924: Peggy Palmer
- 1927: Betty Froome Puddy
- 1930: Winifred Louise "Wynne" Fisher
- 1936: Maurine Bonython
- 1947: Ashleigh Hambridge Tobin
- 1954: Shirley Curry

=== Violin ===
- 1898: Nora Kyffin Thomas
- 1902: Eugene Horatio Alderman
- 1906: Daisy Kennedy
- 1907: Bertha Jones
- 1909: Hilda Marie Reimann, (Note: Hilda was a daughter of Gotthold Reimann)
- 1912: Erica Chaplin (aged 13)
- 1916: Tryphena Grace Pyne
- 1922: Edward Black
- 1929: George Hooker
- 1933: Teresa Audrey Commane
- 1947: Beatrice Jane Allgrove
- 1954: I. Beckler

=== Violoncello ===
- 1902: Harold Stephen Parsons
- 1904: Fritz Homburg
- 1920: Melville W. J. Williams
- 1927: John O'Connor McCabe
- 1935: Beatrice Ellen Pether

=== Organ ===
- 1912: Alfred Bampton
- 1924: Arnold Carey Farley
- 1928: Norman Chinner
- 1930: Gordon Bowen
- 1936: Clarence Black (Note: Black began his music studies while a longterm hospital inpatient.)
- 1937: Clifford Reginald Bevan (Note: Bevan was a student of Ernst Koch and Maude Puddy.)
- 1940: Colin Holmes
- 1947: John Murray Gordon
- 1954: P. Cooper

=== Singing ===
- 1902: Maurice Clayton Chenoweth (tenor)
- 1906: May Clytie Hine
- 1908: two awarded

Muriel E. Cheek
Walter J. Wood (special tenor prize)

- 1909: Francis H. Halls
- 1916: two awarded

Hilda Simcock (contralto)
Annie Vera Thrush

- 1919: three awarded

Valda Harvey
Raymond Wood
Reginald Thrush (special tenor prize)

- 1929: Geraldine Cash
- 1931: Mavis Beryl Kekwick
- 1936: Mary Constance Dempster

== Eugene Alderman Scholarship ==
The Alderman Scholarship was founded 1908 by Eugene Alderman, and after his death revived as a memorial from funds raised for the purpose, and in this incarnation was awarded concurrently with the Elder Scholarship, for students of violin (for preference), otherwise violoncello, pianoforte, organ, or singing. It was originally for three years' tuition at the Elder Conservatorium, but later for a cash amount of $18 10s. (around $1000 in today's values).

== See also ==
- Elder Overseas Scholarship to Royal College of Music, London
