= Dudley Park, South Australia =

Dudley Park
- Suburb
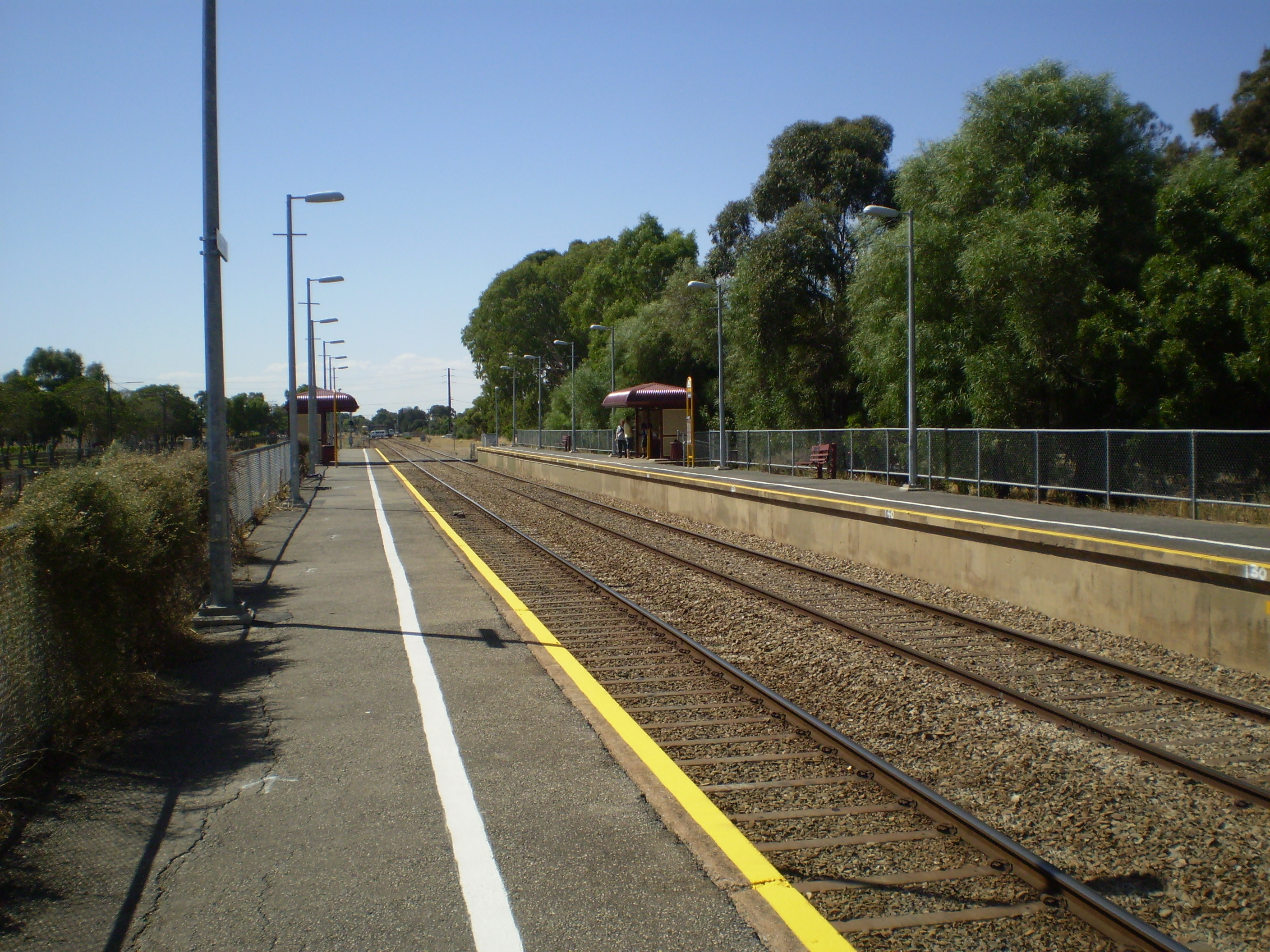
- Dudley Park Railway Station

- Coordinates: 34°52′48″S 138°34′48″E
- Country: Australia
- State: South Australia
- City: Adelaide
- LGA: City of Port Adelaide Enfield
- Location: 3 km (1.9 mi) north of Adelaide city centre
- Established: 1909

Government
  - State electorate: Croydon
  - Federal division: Adelaide

Population
  - Total: 670 (SAL 2021)
- Postcode: 5008
Suburbs around Dudley Park
Ferryden Park	Regency Park	Kilburn
Croydon Park	Dudley Park	Prospect
Renown Park	Devon Park	Prospect

Dudley Park, is a suburb of Adelaide, South Australia, located approximately 3 kilometres north-west of the CBD. The suburb is bordered by Regency Road (north), Simpson Avenue (south), the Adelaide-Gawler railway line (east), and a line directly north–south from the Harrison Road-Simpson Avenue intersection to Regency Road (west).

The Dudley Park Cemetery is located within the suburb at the corner of Simpson Avenue and Exeter Terrace.

Two railway stations border the suburb, Islington railway station and Dudley Park railway station.

== History ==
By the turn of the twentieth century, the Dudley Park area was known as Islington, a name preserved in the present-day Islington railway station and also used for the Islington sewage farm (now Regency Park) from 1881 until 1966.

In October 1909, the Dudley Park subdivision was created and named after William Humble Ward, 2nd Earl of Dudley who was the Governor-General of Australia from 1908 to 1911 and had visited South Australia earlier that year.

In 1940, a new factory was established by Becker Pty. Ltd. to manufacture caffeine, theobromine and other drugs on a 40 acres (16 ha) site on Pym Street in Dudley Park. This had become necessary as the major global source for caffeine had been the Netherlands, which had been occupied by Germany early in World War II. The primary feedstock for caffeine production was cocoa waste imported from other states of Australia. As the factory was being established, the state government assisted with a new road and railway crossing, and extending the metropolitan sewerage to the area. An explosion at the chemical works in 1942 resulted in the death of two workers. The most well-known product of this factory would have been Bex Powders. The facade of the factory and administration building have local heritage protection.

== Government ==
Dudley Park is located within the local government area of the Port Adelaide Enfield, the state Electoral District of Croydon and the federal Division of Adelaide
