= George Bennett (organist) =

English organist in Australia

George Bennett (c. 1817 – September 1854) was an English musician, best known as an organist and choir leader in the young colony of South Australia, where he spent the last 15 years of his life.

== History ==
Bennett was born in Wiltshire, and received his musical education from his uncle, Thomas Bennett (1779–1848), organist of Chichester Cathedral, where young Bennett also served as a chorister.

He arrived in South Australia in 1839 aboard the barque Prince Regent (capt. Evans). By 1843 he was involved with the Adelaide Choral Society, esteemed "one of our elite musical professors" with William Ewens and Moss. He was involved in most musical enterprises in the colony, notably as organist to the Wesleyan chapel, Pirie Street.

In 1843 he led the Choral Society in an oratorio at the Wesleyan church, Gawler Place, in 1844 at the South Australian Company's rooms and in 1847 Bennett, Murray, McDonald and Thompson gave a similar programme at the Great Room, Freemason's Tavern. In 1848 they again gave a creditable concert.

In 1847, while Bennett was organist for (Anglican) Holy Trinity Church, the Legislative Council directed £105.0.0 towards replacing that church's organ.

On 1 March 1848 he was the pianist for a "Grand Evening Concert" of favorite arias from opera and other choice pieces, at the new Queen's Theatre, Adelaide. Miss Lazar was the solo vocalist. A concert at the Mechanics' Hall on 31 January 1849 was injudiciously (according to the editor of a rival newspaper) accompanied by a lecture on sanatory reform by John Stephens.

In April 1848 he led a concert by the Choral Society at the Pulteney Street School, held as a fundraiser for a small pipe organ built by Samuel Marshall of Currie Street for St John's Church. The organ was opened by Bennett, who had some kind of business relationship with Marshall.

At the time of his death, aged 37, he was organist for the Pirie Street Wesleyan Church. He had recently opened Christ Church's newly installed pipe organ.

He also taught piano, organ and violin playing, and singing.

== Family ==
Bennett married Elizabeth (c. 1818 – 13 September 1880); they had a son, born c. 1846.
