= Oliver Fartach-Naini =

German guitarist

- Born: August 7, 1964 (age 62); Scherzingen, Switzerland
- Genres: Classical music, Tango
- Occupations: Guitarist, teacher
- Instrument: Guitar
- Years active: 1992 - present
- Labels: Kreuzberg Records, Acoustic Music Records, and Deutsche Grammophon
- Website: ethnoclassics.com

Oliver Fartach-Naini (born 1964) is a German guitarist living in Australia where he teaches at the Elder Conservatorium of Music, University of Adelaide. He is regularly involved in organising festivals and performing classical guitar for the public.

== Biography ==
Oliver Fartach-Naini was nine when his German mother separated from his father and left Tehran. She took him to Germany. He studied classical guitar at the Music School Berlin-Wedding from 1987 to 1991, with Christian Bänsch, and then graduated from the Berlin University of the Arts under Carlo Domeniconi, and with Laurie Randolph with a degree in music education. He attended the University of Music and Theatre Leipzig, again with Randolph, and received his artist diploma.

He worked as a guitar teacher at the music school Berlin-Wedding. With Korean guitarist Lee Song-Ou, a fellow student from Berlin, he formed a guitar duo in 1991, and they have recorded CDs so far, the last in 2007 with Deutsche Grammophon with compositions by Franz Schubert, with Richard Yongjae O'Neill (viola) and Jong-Ho Park (guitar).

Since 1994 he has performed with Thea Nielsen (flute), playing classical as well as Persian and Indian music. Composer Majid Derakhshani, who composed several pieces for the duo. With Iranian Amir Abbas they formed the ensemble "Didar", which in 2004 recorded the CD Live in Berlin.

Fartach-Naini plays tango music as well; in 2003 his ensemble "Tango Concertante" (saxophone, violin, guitar, piano, double bass) recorded the CD Tangos sin palabras.

He moved to Adelaide (Australia), where he teaches guitar at the Elder Conservatorium of Music, at the University of Adelaide. He also organized a festival, "1st Adelaide Chamber Music School for Flute, Violin and Guitar", with six lecturers from five countries in 2006.

Oliver Fartach-Naini performs as a soloist, in duo with Korean guitarist Professor Lee Song-Ou, German flautist Thea Nielsen and as a member of the quintet "Tango Concertante".

== Recordings ==
- Movement For Two Guitars - Guitar Duo Lee Song-Ou & Oliver Fartach-Naini (1997)
- Suite Buenos Aires - Thea Nielsen, Flute & Oliver Fartach-Naini, Guitar (1998)
- Frutti Di Mare - Guitar Duo Lee Song-Ou & Oliver Fartach-Naini (2002)
- Tangos Sin Palabras - Tango Concertante plays Piazzolla, Troilo et al. (2003)
- Ex Oriente Lux, music from India, Iran, Austria, Germany and Argentina - Thea Nielsen, Flute & Oliver Fartach-Naini, Guitar (2004)
- Didar – Live in Berlin (compositions of Majid Derakhshani) - Majid Derakhshani, Tar, Setar & Voice; Thea Nielsen, Flute, Oliver Fartach-Naini, Guitar; Amir Abbas :Zare, Daf (2004)
- Winter Journey (compositions of Franz Schubert) - Richard Yongjae O'Neill, Viola, Guitar Duo Lee Song-Ou & Oliver Fartach-Naini, Jong-Ho Park, Guitar (2007)
