= Elder Conservatorium of Music and School of Performing Arts =

Australian conservatorium of music

Coordinates: 34.9201°S 138.6050°E

- Main entrance in 2026
- Former name: Elder Conservatorium of Music
- Type: Music and performing arts school
- Established: 1898 (antecedents from 1883)
- Parent institution: Adelaide University
- Dean: Anna Goldsworthy
- Location: Adelaide, South Australia, Australia
- Campus: Urban
- Website: Official website

The Elder Conservatorium of Music and School of Performing Arts, formerly Elder Conservatorium of Music, also known as "The Con", is located in the centre of Adelaide, the capital of South Australia, and is named in honour of its benefactor, Sir Thomas Elder (1818–1897). Dating in its earliest form from 1883, it has a history in professional training for musical performance, musical composition, research in all fields of music, and music education. The Elder Conservatorium and its forerunners have been parts of the University of Adelaide since the early 1880s, now Adelaide University. As of 2026 the director is Anna Goldsworthy.

== History ==
The Elder Conservatorium of Music was formally constituted in 1898 as the result of a major philanthropic bequest from the will of the Scottish-Australian pastoralist, Sir Thomas Elder, whose statue stands outside Elder Hall. The history, however, goes back further than 1898. An earlier philanthropic donation from Sir Thomas Elder had helped to establish the Elder Professorship of Music in 1883, with the first incumbent taking up the post in 1884. At the same time, Sir Thomas Elder had established endowment funds for the Royal College of Music in London to support the Elder Overseas Scholarship (in Music) and the Music Board of the University of Adelaide to support the Elder Scholarships in Music. 1883 was also the year in which Berlin-trained pianist Immanuel Gotthold Reimann founded his privately owned and run Adelaide College of Music, of which Cecil Sharp (later to become famous as collector of folk songs) became co-director in 1889. For the first few years the new school of music at the University of Adelaide (which focussed on composition and theory) and the Adelaide College of Music (which focussed on practical training in performance) complemented each other. In 1898 the two schools were merged, operating in the college's Wakefield Street premises until 1900, when the North Terrace building was completed. Hermann Heinicke founded the first Conservatorium Orchestra.

The Elder Conservatorium of Music is a product of three mergers: one in the late nineteenth century (1898) with the Adelaide College of Music; one in the late twentieth century (1991), with the School of Performing Arts of the then South Australian College of Advanced Education; and one at the beginning of the twenty-first century (2001), with the School of Music of the Adelaide Institute of TAFE (aka Flinders Street School of Music). Formerly a faculty of the university (the Faculty of Music) it is now constituted as a professional school within the Faculty of Arts. Since 2002, it has been an associate member of the Association of European Conservatoires (AEC), and is also a partner school of the Helpmann Academy, an umbrella body created by the State Government of South Australia to promote collaboration between various schools of visual and performing arts.

There have so far been seven incumbents of the Elder Professorship of Music, all of whom have also served as Director and/or Dean of the Elder Conservatorium of Music and have provided the artistic and academic leadership for the institution: Professor Joshua Ives (1884–1901); Professor J. Matthew Ennis (1902–1918); Professor E. Harold Davies (1918–1948); pianist and arts administrator, Professor John Bishop OBE (1948–1964); the tenor, Professor David Galliver AM (1966–1983); German conductor, Professor Heribert Esser (1986–1993); and composer, Professor Charles Bodman Rae (since 2001). Since the late 1970s the administrative position of director of the conservatorium has from time to time been occupied by a staff member other than the Elder Professor of Music. In this category can be included: the clarinettist, David Shepherd; the pianist, Clemens Leske AM; the horn player, Patrick Brislan; the pianist, David Lockett AM; the choral conductor, Carl Crossin OAM, and the noted composer, Professor Graeme Koehne AO. On 15 July 2022, pianist and writer Anna Goldsworthy was announced as the new director, commencing on 18 July 2022.

In 1886, Professor Ives established the first Australian public music examinations system, modelled on that of the Guildhall School of Music in London. This directly led to the establishment of the Australian Music Examinations Board (AMEB). In 1898, through the Elder Conservatorium, the University of Adelaide was the first in Australia to establish regulations for the degree of Doctor of Music (DMus), and in 1902, Edward Harold Davies was awarded the first Australian doctorate of music. In 1918 the university became the first in Australia to award a doctorate in music to a woman, Ruby Davy. In addition to Davies and Davy, recipients of the DMus award have included: Tristram Cary, OAM; Sir Peter Maxwell Davies CBE; Graeme Koehne; Charles Bodman Rae; David Lockett AM; and Ross Edwards AM.

Throughout the Conservatorium's history, many performing musicians, conductors and composers have been members of staff, including: Sir Peter Maxwell Davies (Composition Fellow); Ruby Davy (Counterpoint); Professor David Cubbin (Flute); Clive Carey (Voice); Jiří Tancibudek (Oboe); Gabor Reeves (Clarinet); Beryl Kimber (Violin); Clemens Leske (Piano); James Whitehead (Cello); Lance Dossor (Piano); Richard Meale AO MBE (Composition); Tristram Cary (Electronic Music); Janis Laurs (Cello); Keith Crellin OAM (Violist); and Graeme Koehne AO (Composition; Director).

From 1978 to 1994 Professor Andrew McCredie held a personal chair in Musicology. The Australian String Quartet was established in 1985 and since 1991 has been Quartet-in-Residence at the Elder Conservatorium.

The Bishop years are generally considered to have been some of the most exciting and progressive in the history of the Elder Conservatorium, with initiatives such as the appointment of the University of Adelaide Wind Quintet, and the establishment of the Adelaide Festival of Arts (of which Bishop was the inaugural artistic director). In 2005 the Elder Conservatorium received a Classical Music Award (from the Australasian Performing Right Association) for "outstanding contribution by an organisation" (the only Australian music academy to have won such an award), in recognition of its music program for the 2004 Adelaide Festival of Arts. In 2011, 2013, 2015, and every year from 2017 thereafter, the Elder Conservatorium has hosted the Australian Youth Orchestra's annual summer school, National Music Camp (founded by Bishop).

Non-traditional research activities range across performance studies (Classical, Jazz, Music Theatre, Popular Music, and Sonic Arts), composition, music curatorial studies, music industry entrepreneurship, and digital arts and related multi-media. The Conservatorium is co-host to two research aggregations: the Sia Furler Institute for Contemporary Music and Media, and the J. M. Coetzee Centre for Creative Practice.

== Description and governance ==
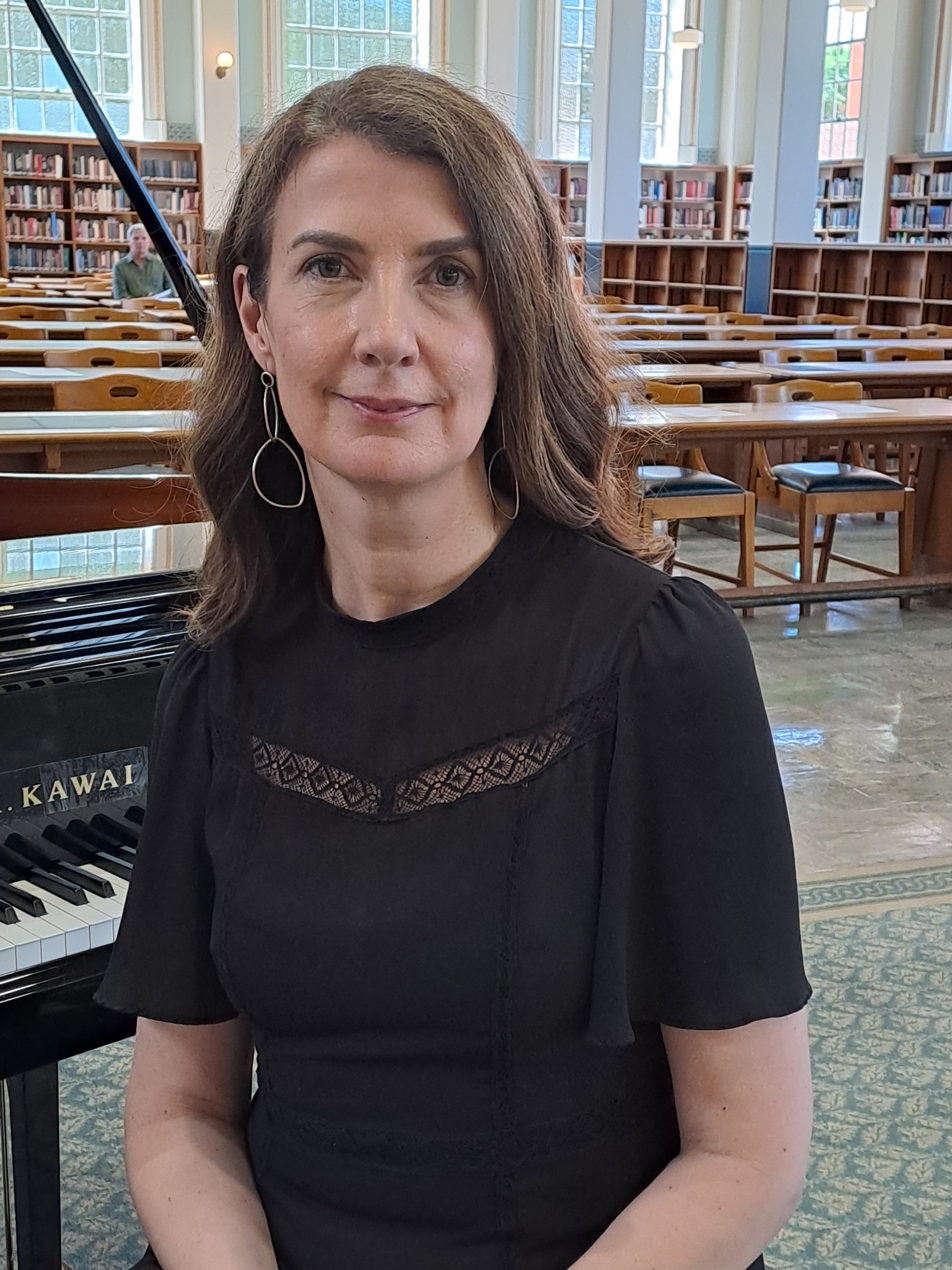
Anna Goldsworthy, Barr-Smith Library reading room, 9 November 2023

Since the merger of universities which created Adelaide University in 2026, the Elder Conservatorium of Music and School of Performing Arts is located within the College of Creative Arts, Design and Humanities at the university. As of 2026, Anna Goldsworthy is dean of the conservatorium. Craig Batty is pro-vice-chancellor of the College of Creative Arts, Design and Humanities.

The conservatorium occupies the Schulz Building, which had been part of the city campus of the South Australian College of Advanced Education before the 1991 merger. The building was designed by state government architects and opened in 1964. It was named after Adolf John Schulz, third principal of the college.

=== Centre for Aboriginal Studies in Music ===
The Centre for Aboriginal Studies in Music (CASM, founded 1972) is located within the Elder Conservatorium. It offers a 12-month foundation course, allowing musicians to enrol for a degree at the Elder Conservatorium afterwards.

== Academic programs ==
The Elder Conservatorium of Music has been awarding degrees and diplomas in music to both men and women since the end of the nineteenth century. It was originally intended that the degree program be modelled on that at the University of Cambridge.

The Elder Conservatorium offers undergraduate and postgraduate programs.

=== Associate in Music, University of Adelaide ===
Associate in Music, University of Adelaide (AMUA) was a degree conferred by the university. It was initially introduced in 1900 as a diploma course, predating the formation of the Australian Music Examinations Board (AMEB) in 1918. It was phased out in 1972. Notable graduates included: Maude Mary Puddy, (first graduate, 1900); Clytie Hine, 1908; and Arnold Matters, 1926.

== Facilities ==
=== Elder Hall ===
Elder Hall is one of Australia's concert halls. Building commenced in 1898 and it was officially opened in 1900 by the then Governor of South Australia, Lord Tennyson. Its interior features a hammer-beam roof modelled on the Middle Temple in London, and a three-manual organ built by Casavant Frères of Canada. Elder Hall is the primary focus of the Conservatorium's successful annual concert series. Conservatorium concerts are also given in several other locations, including the Adelaide Town Hall, and St Peter's (Anglican) Cathedral in North Adelaide.

=== Electronic Music Unit ===
The Electronic Music Unit (EMU) is the hub of music technology, sound production, sonic arts and electronic music at the Elder Conservatorium. Formerly known as the Elder Electronic Music Studio (1962–1994) and the Performing Arts Technology Unit (1994–2001) it was founded in 1962 as a result of the engagement of Dr Henk Badings as composer in residence at the Elder Conservatorium. Its facilities include recording studios, computer suites, and a collection of analogue synthesizers dating back to the 1960s. It is also used as a public venue for concerts of contemporary and experimental music. It was the first such studio in Australia. Many composers have been associated with it, including Henk Badings, Peter Tahourdin, Tristram Cary (the designer of the legendary VCS3 synthesizer), Martin Wesley-Smith and Stephen Whittington. EMU offers programs providing knowledge and skills in music technology, such as sound engineering, sound designing for games or films, electronic composition or performance, and software for plug-in development or sound art.

== Performing ensembles ==
=== Classical Choirs ===
Carl Crossin OAM has been Head of Choral Music at the Conservatorium since 2002 when the current choral program was initiated. He is also artistic director and conductor of Adelaide Chamber Singers and was awarded an OAM for his services to music (choral music in particular) in the 2007 Australia Day Honours List.

==== Elder Conservatorium Chorale ====
The Elder Conservatorium Chorale is a mixed voice choir that draws its membership from the Elder Conservatorium of Music, the University of Adelaide at large, other universities, and from the wider community. As well as putting on their own concerts as part of the Elder Conservatorium's Concert Series, the choir regular performs with the Adelaide Symphony Orchestra.

==== Bella Voce ====
Bella Voce is a female voice choir.

=== Orchestras ===
==== Elder Conservatorium Symphony Orchestra ====
The Elder Conservatorium Symphony Orchestra (ECSO), conducted by Luke Dollman, consists mainly of full-time students from the Conservatorium's music programs and also includes some students from other faculties within the university.

==== Elder Conservatorium Wind Orchestra ====
The Elder Conservatorium Wind Orchestra is conducted by Colin Prichard. Past conductors include Bryan Griffiths.

==== Elder Conservatorium Chamber Orchestra ====
Founded in 1973 by the late Jiri Tancibudek, the Elder Conservatorium Chamber Orchestra draws on advanced students from the Conservatorium. Currently directed by Elizabeth Layton.

=== Jazz Ensembles ===
==== Adelaide Connection ====
The Adelaide Connection is the Elder Conservatorium's premier Jazz Choir. Under the direction of Anita Wardell, the group consists of between 15 and 18 students and has a mixture of soprano, alto, tenor and bass voices. The Connection have built a repertoire of harmonically sophisticated vocal music, both a cappella and accompanied. The majority of the vocal arrangements focus on close part harmony and complex jazz rhythms and sight reading is a strong focus for this ensemble. To strengthen the students' knowledge of jazz history, chosen repertoire includes music from early jazz choir arrangers such as Gene Puerling to current arrangers such as Darmon Meader and Kerry Marsh.

==== Elder Conservatorium Big Band ====
Under the long time direction of Hal Hall and now Dusty Cox, the Big Band has showcased a broad range of material from the traditions of Basie and Ellington to contemporary music. The ensemble has worked with many 'jazz giants', including James Morrison, Lee Konitz, Errol Buddle, Don Burrows and many others. It has appeared at the Manly Jazz Festival three times; in 1995 it featured at the Monsalvat Jazz Festival, and in 2002 performed at the Wangaratta Jazz Festival. The Big Band has also toured extensively throughout South Australia and in 1994 it produced a CD, Live at the Walker's Arms and completed a studio recording in 2008.

==== Elder Conservatorium Latin Jazz Ensemble ====
The Latin Jazz Ensemble, directed by Mark Ferguson, was formed in 2009 as the Latin Ensemble to replace three previous student ensembles; Big Band 3, the Jazz Percussion Ensemble and the Keyboard Ensemble. It is a training ensemble; a stepping stone into the Big Band 1. In 2012 it was rebadged as the Cuban Ensemble and the repertoire now focuses on music from the Caribbean, Colombia and New Orleans.

=== Elder Conservatorium Guitar Ensemble ===
The Elder Conservatorium Guitar Ensemble is directed by Oliver Fartach-Naini constitutes a core component of the Elder Conservatorium's classical guitar program. Most of its members are full-time music students.

== Institutional links ==
The Elder Conservatorium is affiliated with music institutions including the Adelaide Symphony Orchestra, the Australian String Quartet and the State Opera of South Australia.

=== Adelaide Symphony Orchestra ===
The Adelaide Symphony Orchestra (ASO) is South Australia's largest performing arts organisation, established in 1936. The orchestra, which is based a short walk from the Conservatorium, provides opportunities for occasional training experience for selected classical performance and composition students. A recent initiative provides for the joining of forces between the ASO and the Elder Conservatorium to offer a conducting program. It is the first time an Australian university and orchestra have collaborated on such a degree program for conductors. Students can study for a Master of Music degree, a graduate diploma, or do an Honours year majoring conducting.

=== Australian String Quartet ===
The Australian String Quartet (ASQ) is Quartet-in-Residence at the University of Adelaide.

Collaborative activities include performances in the Elder Hall lunch hour and evening series concerts, composer forums, chamber music workshops, participation in 1:1 teaching and mentoring opportunities.

=== State Opera South Australia ===
State Opera South Australia (SOSA) is a professional opera company in Adelaide, South Australia, established in 1976. Each year, the State Opera presents at least two major operatic productions at the Adelaide Festival Theatre as well as producing or supporting other smaller productions in the Opera Studio at Netley. Conservatorium graduates in Classical Voice often find employment as professional singers with the State Opera, usually through the Young Artists program, and most of SOSA's current principal singers and many of its chorus are Conservatorium graduates. In addition, the Conservatorium has recently established an ongoing partnership with SOSA that offers student internships and produces a full operatic production each year. This collaboration involves both the Conservatorium's Classical Voice cohort and the symphony orchestra.
