= J. Matthew Ennis =

English pianist and organist

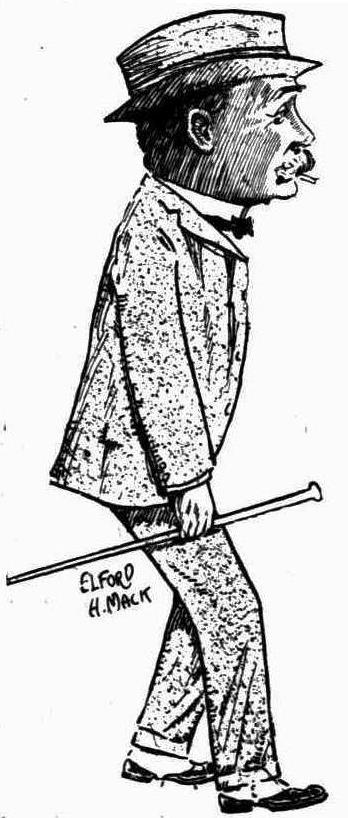
- Drawing of Ennis by "Cosmopolitan"
- Born: 5 August 1864; Dover, Kent, England
- Died: 31 May 1921 (aged 56)
- Education: University of London
- Occupations: Pianist, organist
- Spouse: Jane Isabel Hutchinson (m. 1895; died 1919)
- Father: Matthew Ennis

John Matthew Ennis (5 August 1864 – 31 May 1921), invariably referred to as Matthew Ennis or J. Matthew Ennis, was an English pianist and organist who had a substantial academic career in Adelaide, South Australia.

== History ==
Ennis was born a son of Matthew Ennis in Dover, but grew up in London where he was educated at the University College School. He sang as a choirboy and gained sufficient expertise in organ playing to take his first church appointment as organist at the age of 14, serving at the Church of St Barnabas, King Square, London, from 1878, then the Church of St Philip, Clerkenwell, from 1883 to 1887 (both Commissioners' churches since demolished).

After leaving school, Ennis entered the Post Office, meanwhile studying pianoforte under Edward Dannreuther. It was around this time he decided life as a music teacher would be more interesting.

Ennis graduated B.Mus. (1892) and D.Mus. (1894) at the University of London, passing the four examinations in four years — the first person to do so. He served as choirmaster and organist at Holy Trinity Church (since demolished) in Knightsbridge from 1887 to 1893, and at St Mary's, Brookfield, from 1893 to 1899.

In 1898, Ennis supported Sir John Stainer in founding an association of musical graduates, the Union of Graduates in Music, the object of which was to prevent trafficking in degrees. Around this time he became an advocate of Virgil's method of teaching piano, and became a lecturer and examiner at the Virgil Piano School in London.

Early in 1900, Ennis arrived in Sydney, Australia, to take up an appointment at Christ Church St Laurence near Central station, followed a year later by Mrs Ennis. He did a considerable amount of teaching in Sydney, served for a time as acting city organist, and participated in a series of recitals with renowned Australian pianist Elsie Stanley Hall.

In 1901 Ennis was offered the Chair of Music at the Adelaide University, made vacant by the involuntary retirement of Professor Ives, and in February 1902 arrived in Adelaide to take the position.

In 1910 he assumed conductorship of the Adelaide Choral Society, which led to a number of triumphant concerts.

It was during Ennis's tenure that the New South Wales State Conservatorium of Music joined the other states in adopting a uniform code of public music examinations, finally making the AUMEB examinations universally accepted qualifications throughout Australia.

Ennis retired from the Elder Conservatorium in 1919, when his health began to fail, and was succeeded at the university and Elder Conservatorium by Harold Davies. His wife, who was a violinist, predeceased him by a few years. She was remembered for her work with the Society for the Prevention of Cruelty to Animals,

== Compositions ==
Ennis composed a magnificat for soloists, chorus, strings and organ; also a song, "Beautiful Maiden", but pressure of other duties in Australia did not allow him the freedom for further composition.

== Recognition ==
Friends and supporters of Ennis funded the erection of an ornamented headstone on the couple's grave in the West Terrace Cemetery, and a brass plaque in his memory was placed on the northern wall just inside the western entrance to the Elder Conservatorium.

== Family ==
Ennis married Jane Isabel Hutchinson (? – 21 June 1919) on 17 April 1895. She was a daughter of John Hutchinson CE of London. No mention of any offspring has been found.
