= Carl Crossin =

Australian choral conductor and composer

Carl Bryce David Crossin, OAM
- Born: 1953 (age 72–73)
- Genre: Classical
- Occupations: Conductor, composer, conservatorium director
- Formerly of: Adelaide Chamber Singers
- Website: http://www.adelaide.edu.au/directory/carl.crossin

Carl Crossin OAM (born 1953) is an Australian choral conductor, educator and composer. He is a graduate of the Sydney Conservatorium of Music and the University of Adelaide. He was a director of the Elder Conservatorium of Music in the University of Adelaide in 2010–2014.

== Early development ==
Crossin's initial tertiary education was at the Sydney Conservatorium of Music, where he was awarded a Diploma in Music Education specialising in guitar. While in Sydney, he taught at Whalan High School and developed his conducting skills with the University of NSW Choral Society and the Lachrymae Singers, which he founded.

In 1978 he moved to Adelaide to study at the University of Adelaide and became a music teacher at the Special Music Centre at Brighton High School, as it was then known, where he stayed for fourteen years. In the early 1980s he became a conductor of the Flinders University Choral Society and Graduate Singers and founded the small vocal ensemble Canticle.

From Brighton High School he moved to the Flinders Street School of Music, at the time a technical and further education college in Adelaide, and taught there for nine years.

In 2002, when the Flinders Street School of Music merged with the Elder Conservatorium, he joined the staff of the University of Adelaide, where he has served as Head of Choral Music, Head of Academic Studies, Deputy and acting director, and, during 2010–14, Director.

== Conducting ==
Within the conservatorium, Crossin is the founder and director of the Elder Conservatorium Chorale and the university's chamber choir Adelaide Voices. He conducted Claudio Monteverdi's opera L'Orfeo and Mozart's Le Nozze di Figaro in 2002 and 2003 respectively.

Outside the conservatorium, he has worked as a choral conductor and clinician and over the past 30 years has conducted numerous choirs in Adelaide, including the Flinders University Choral Society, the Gilbert and Sullivan Society of South Australia, Adelaide University Choral Society, Voiceworks and the Adelaide Symphony Chorus. He has conducted the Intervarsity Choral Festival, Sydney Philharmonia Choirs, the Melbourne Chorale and Gondwana Chorale. He is the artistic director of the National Youth Choir of Australia.

== Adelaide Chamber Singers ==
Crossin founded the Adelaide Chamber Singers in 1985, and as director he has toured with them to Britain, Europe, North America and South-East Asia, won several awards for performance and CD recordings, and represented Australia in international choral and music education symposia and festivals. As well, Crossin and the Adelaide Chamber Singers have embarked on a program of commissioning and presenting new choral music.

Crossin's work with the Adelaide Chamber Singers is specifically mentioned in the citation for his Medal of the Order of Australia.

In 2008, the recording of Symphony No. 4 "Star Chant" by Ross Edwards and Fred Watson with the Adelaide Chamber Singers under Crossin's direction won the prize for Vocal or Choral Work of the Year in the APRA Music Awards of 2008.

== Composer and arranger ==
In recent years, Crossin has turned to composition, mostly for voices, and his choral works have been performed not only by a number of Adelaide-based ensembles (Syntony, Adelaide Voices, Elder Conservatorium Chorale, Graduate Singers and Adelaide Chamber Singers) but by interstate and overseas choirs as well.

- Stabat Mater, 2011.
- Dance for the Daughters of Eve, on the debut CD by the vocal trio Eve.
- Requiem for orchestra, chorus and soloist.
- The choral work Caritas was featured by Adelaide Chamber Singers at the 2002 World Symposium on Choral Music in the USA.

== Discography ==
- Edwards, Ross; Mills, Richard, (Conductor); Sexton, Timothy, (Director); Crossin, Carl, (Director); Adelaide Philharmonia Chorus; Adelaide Symphony Orchestra; Adelaide Chamber Singers (2007), Star chant, Australian Broadcasting Corporation
- Adelaide Chamber Singers; Crossin, Carl. (Conductor); Allegri, Gregorio, 1582–1652. Miserere; Monteverdi, Claudio, 1567–1643. Cantate Domino; Charpentier, Marc-Antoine, 1643–1704. Messe de minuit. Selections; Koehne, Graeme. Mass for the middle-aged; Adams, Stephen. Sydney dreaming; Rachmaninoff, Sergei, 1873–1943. Vsenoshchnoe bdenie. Selections; McKie, Duncan. Inland (2005), Voices of the spirit, Adelaide Chamber Singers Inc
- Llewellyn, Becky; Abbott, Graham; Walker, Antony; Crossin, Carl; Pusz, Ryszard J; Stewart-Klein, Alison; Lansky, Enrique; Booth, Nancy Davis; Adelaide Symphony Orchestra; Adelaide Chamber Orchestra; Lights Chamber Ensemble; Adelaide Chamber Choir; Catalina Chamber Orchestra (2002), Milerum's basket, Move Records, MD 3261
- Adelaide Chamber Singers; Clark, Neville; Crossin, Carl (2001), Celebration: a miscellany of recordings 1996–2000, Adelaide Chamber Singers
- Maclean, Clare; Ford, Andrew (Composer); Crossin, Carl (Conductor); Leek, Stephen (Composer); Maclean, Clare. Christ the King; Leek, Stephen. Great southern spirits; Ford, Andrew. Wassails and lullabies; Maclean, Clare. Et Misericordia; Adelaide Chamber Singers (1998), Different angels, Adelaide Chamber Singers
- Kashtan Ukrainian Choir; Misiajlo, Stephen; Crossin, Carl; Adelaide Youth Orchestra (1998), Christmas in Ukraine, Kashtan Ukrainian Song and Dance Ensemble
- Adelaide Chamber Singers; Crossin, Carl (1996), O magnum mysterium, Adelaide Chamber Singers
- Crossin, Carl; Adelaide Chamber Singers (1987), What sweeter music can we bring than a carol, Adelaide Tape Duplicators for Adelaide Chamber Singers
