= Australian Youth Orchestra =

- Youth orchestra training organisation
- Short name: AYO
- Former name: Youth Music Australia
- Founded: 1948
- Location: Australia
- Website: www.ayo.com.au

The Australian Youth Orchestra (AYO), formerly Youth Music Australia, is a training organisation for pre-professional musicians. It originated in the music camps founded by John Bishop and Ruth Alexander in 1948. AYO offers tailored training and performance programs yearly for aspiring musicians, composers, arts administrators and music journalists, aged between 12 and 30.

== Structure ==
The Australian Youth Orchestra is one of eight "national elite training organisations" of the Australian Roundtable for Arts Training Excellence (ARTS8), partially funded by the Australian Government via the Office for the Arts.

AYO offers several programs:

- Orchestra and chamber programs
  - AYO Symphonists, residential program for musician of high school age
  - Australian Youth Orchestra, flagship orchestra
  - National Music Camp, two weeks' orchestral program
  - Professional immersion
  - Momentum Ensemble, by invitation
- Arts administration and production
  - Media and Communication
  - Orchestral management
  - Sound production
- Composition

== Awards and nominations ==
=== APRA Classical Music Awards ===
The APRA Classical Music Awards are presented annually by Australasian Performing Right Association (APRA) and Australian Music Centre (AMC).

Year	Nominee / work	Award	Result
2007	Body Torque – The Australian Ballet, Australian Youth Orchestra, Sonic Art Ensemble	Outstanding Contribution by an Organisation	Nominated
2007	2006 National Music Camp Composition Program, Body Torque – Australian Youth Orchestra, The Australian Ballet	Outstanding Contribution to Australian Music in Education	Won

=== ARIA Music Awards ===
The ARIA Music Awards is an annual awards ceremony that recognises excellence, innovation, and achievement across all genres of Australian music. They commenced in 1987.

Year	Nominee / work	Award	Result	Ref.
1989	Australia Day / Child of Australia (with Sydney Symphony Orchestra, Joan Carden & John Howard)	Best Classical Album	Nominated	
1990	Works of Koehne, Stravinsky, Messiaen, Ravel	Best Classical Album	Nominated	
