= Maude Mary Puddy =

Australian pianist and music educator

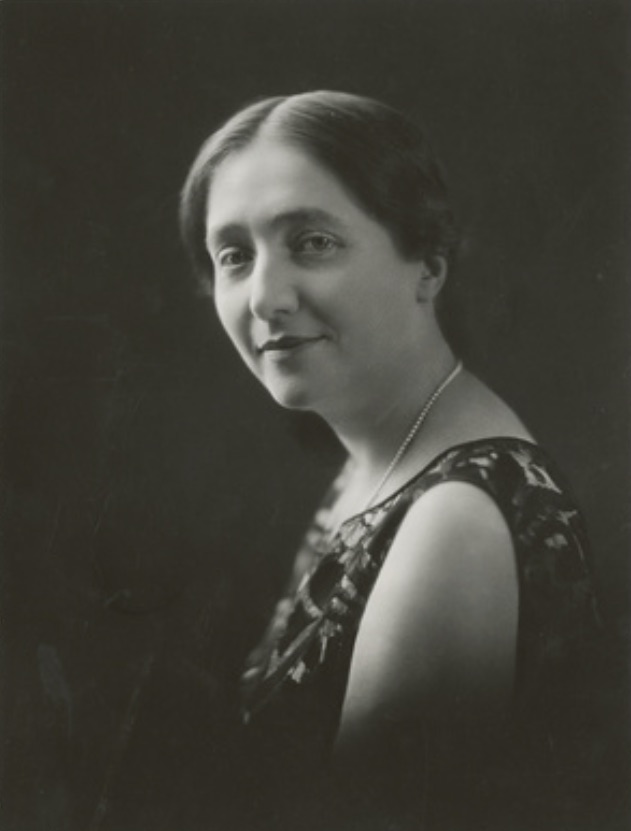
- Puddy, c. 1920
- Born: 27 March 1883; Brompton, South Australia
- Died: 1 August 1974 (aged 91)

Maude Mary Puddy (27 March 1883 – 1 August 1974) was an Australian pianist and music educator.

== Early life and education ==
Puddy was born in Brompton, South Australia on 27 March 1883. She was the third daughter of Cornish-born Jane (née Coombe) and Devon-born Albert Puddy.

She was educated at the Currie Street Model School and then Advanced School for Girls in Grote Street, Adelaide. From the age of eight she was taught piano by her father. In 1893, competing against girls of 15, she won the annual Public School Exhibition for piano. She performed a public concert in August 1894 and was praised for both her technique and "con amore style of playing". She won the Public School Exhibition for piano again in 1894. She began lessons with Gotthold Reimann at the Adelaide College of Music in 1895 and continued under his tuition when the college merged with the Elder Conservatorium of Music at the University of Adelaide, studying under the tuition of, Welsh composer, Bryceson Treharne. In 1898 Puddy received special mention by the examiners assessing the competitors for the Elder pianoforte scholarship. The following year she won that three-year scholarship. In 1900 she was awarded the first diploma of associate of music and in 1905 she graduated with a bachelor of music.

== Career ==
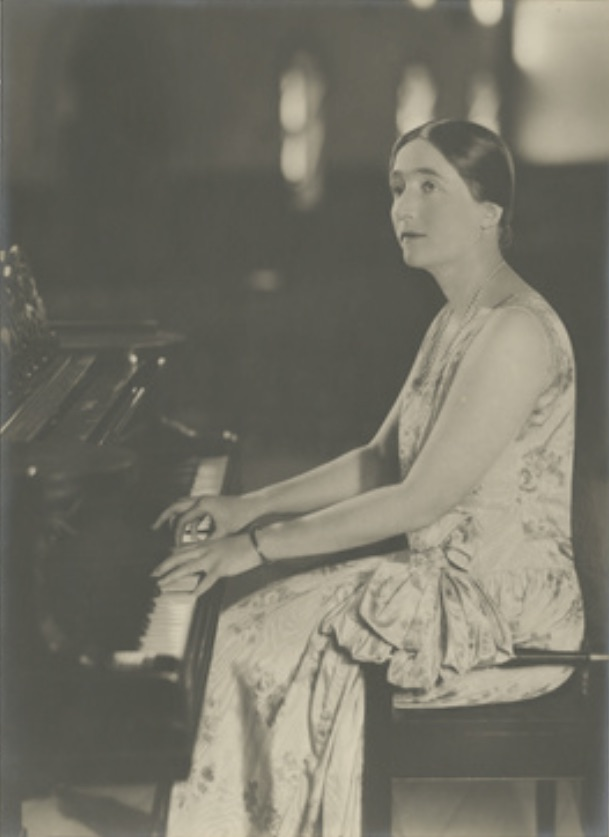
Puddy at the piano, c. 1920

In 1905, Puddy left Adelaide for Vienna, via Melbourne and London, with her eldest sister, Rosa. There she studied with Theodor Leschetizky, gave concerts and worked as a student teacher. Leschetizky said of her, "her notable talent has helped her not only to perform as a distinguished public piano player, but also to teach with an unusual measure of success". He further honoured her by dedicating Valse Prelude (op. 49, no. 2) to her.

Puddy and Rosa moved to London in 1913 and stayed there for the duration of World War I. In addition to teaching and performing professionally, Puddy entertained Australian and other soldiers in camps and recovering in hospitals.

In 1919, she was appointed by the University of Adelaide to fill Reimann's position as locum tenens. Taking up the job in January 1920 she remained at the Elder Conservatorium until her retirement in 1949.

She accompanied Benno Moiseiwitsch, playing the orchestral part of Tchaikowsky's 1st Piano Concerto to his solo at a concert in Adelaide in 1923 which was met by a "storm of applause".

From 1928, she performed on radio 5CL as a soloist, accompanist and as a member of the Elder Trio (Charles Schilsky and Harold Parsons).

Puddy died on 1 August 1974 and was buried at Dudley Park Cemetery.

== Legacy ==
Five years after her retirement, a scholarship was inaugurated to be awarded to a piano student at the Elder Conservatorium.
