= John Bishop (academic) =

Australian academic, conductor and patron of the arts

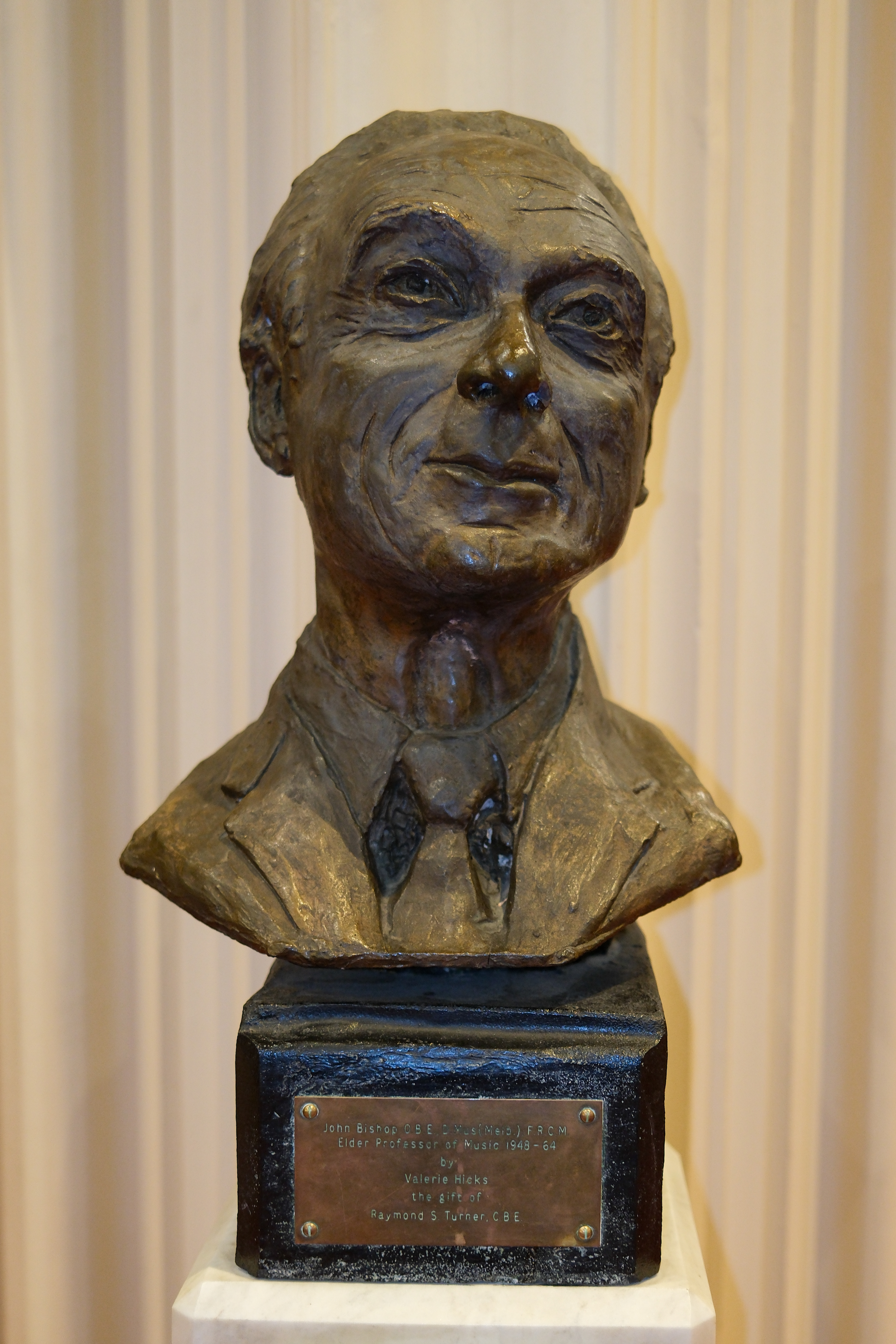
Bust of Bishop at the Elder Conservatorium of Music In 2026

Lionel Albert Jack "John" Bishop OBE (26 October 1903 – 14 December 1964) was an Australian academic, conductor and patron of the arts. Bishop played a leading role in the development of music education in Australia and was a founder and first artistic director of the Adelaide Festival of Arts.

== Life and career ==
Bishop was born in Adelaide and studied piano from the age of 12 under the tuition of the distinguished Adelaide teacher William Silver. In 1919, he won the Alexander Clark Scholarship to the Elder Conservatorium, and in 1923, he won the South Australian Elder Scholarship to the Royal College of Music in London. There, Bishop studied conducting in addition to furthering his piano studies with Herbert Fryer. His first appointment as a conductor came in 1928 for the Royal Wellington Choral Union. In 1930 he established the Wellington Philharmonic Orchestra in New Zealand.

He returned to Australia in 1936 to take up a position as Director of Music at Scotch College in Melbourne. From 1940 to 1947 he was conductor of the Melbourne University Conservatorium Orchestra. His involvement with music in Victoria led him to become the first president of the Victorian School Music Association. From 1948, with the co-operation of fellow music teacher, Ruth Alexander, he organised summer music camps for young musicians. In 1954, he founded the National Music Camp Association and was subsequently responsible for the establishment of the Australian Youth Orchestra in 1957.

In 1948, Bishop became a professor of music at the University of Adelaide, where he reformed the curriculum and faculty and set up a visiting lectureship program. He formed a partnership with Sir Lloyd Dumas in the late 1950s to help found a major arts event in South Australia. He was instrumental in the establishment of the Adelaide Festival of Arts and became its inaugural arts director in 1960. Bishop continued in this position until his death. His involvement in the arts also included his positions as chairman of the UNESCO Committee for Music and as federal president of the Arts Council of Australia.

He died suddenly in the foyer of Australia House in London, of hypertensive cardiovascular disease, on 14 December 1964, aged 61.

== Honours ==
He was appointed an Officer of the Order of the British Empire (OBE) in 1953.

== Notes ==
Preceded by none	Director of the Adelaide Festival of Arts; 1960–1964	Succeeded by Advisory Board
