= Dudley Park railway station =

Railway station in Adelaide, South Australia

Coordinates: 34°53′6″S 138°35′0″E

Dudley Park
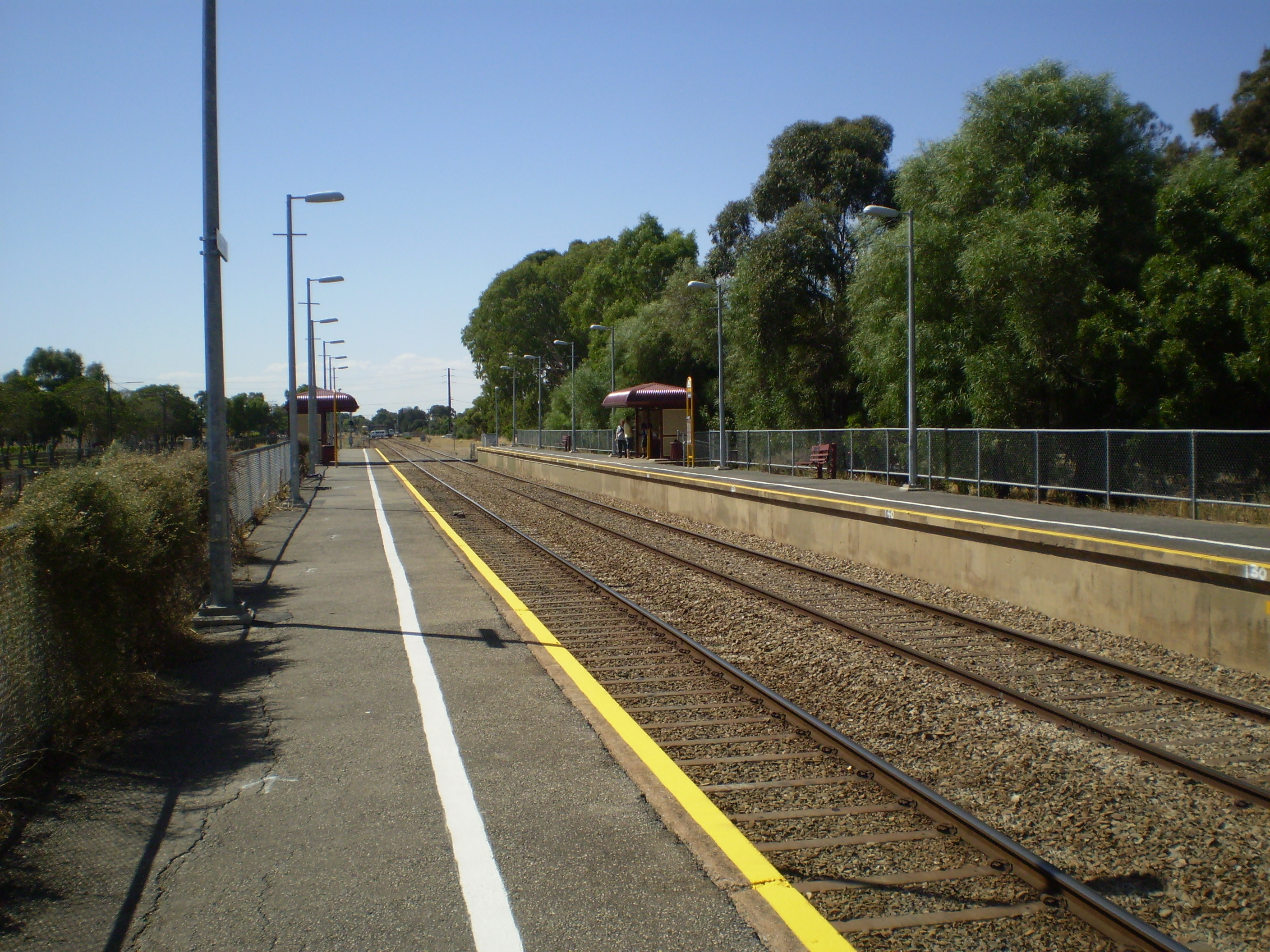
- Northbound view from Platform 1, March 2008

General information
- Location: Exeter Terrace, Dudley Park
- Owner: Department for Infrastructure & Transport
- Operator: Adelaide Metro
- Line: Gawler
- Distance: 4.9 km from Adelaide
- Platforms: 2
- Connections: None

Construction
- Structure type: Ground, side platforms
- Parking: Yes
- Cycle facilities: Yes
- Accessible: Yes

Other information
- Station code: 16508 (to City); 18539 (to Gawler Central)
- Website: Adelaide Metro

History
- Opened: 1915
- Rebuilt: 1940s

Services
Preceding station	Adelaide Metro	Following station
Ovingham towards Adelaide	Gawler line	Islington towards Gawler Central
Location

Dudley Park Railway Station is located on the Gawler line. Situated in the inner northern Adelaide suburb of Dudley Park, it is located 4.9 kilometres (3.0 mi) from Adelaide station.

== History ==
The station opened in 1915.

As a part of the Gawler Rail Line Station Refresh Program started by the Australian and South Australian governments, the station's fencing and ramps were improved in 2022.

== Platforms and Services ==
Dudley Park has two side platforms and is serviced by Adelaide Metro Gawler line services. The station is serviced by trains every 30 minutes, and on weekdays most of these services terminate at Gawler only.

Platform	Destination
1	Gawler and Gawler Central
2	Adelaide

To the west of the station lies the Australian Rail Track Corporation standard gauge line to Crystal Brook.
