= Christ Church, North Adelaide =

Christ Church
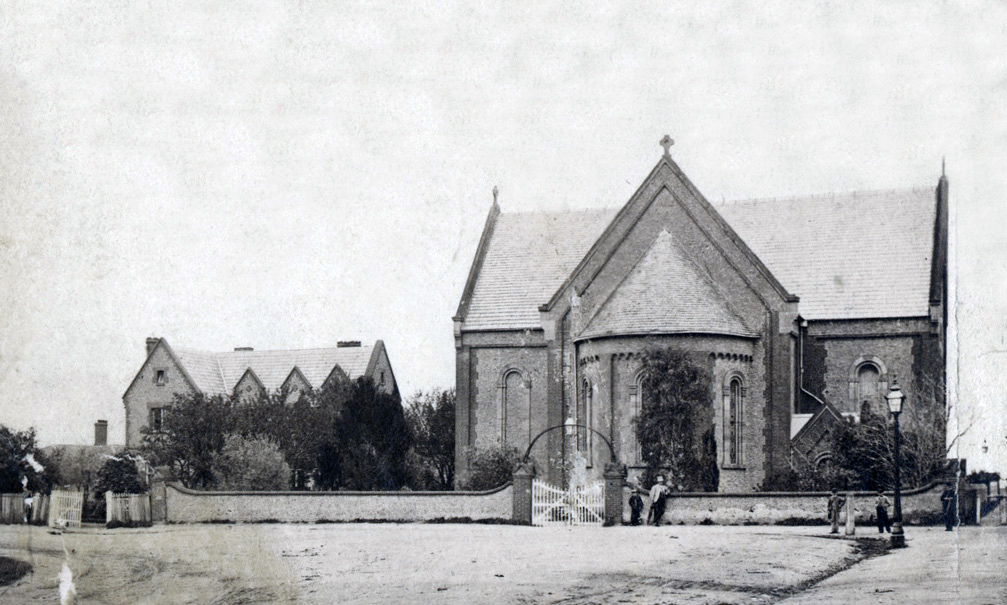
- Christ Church and parsonage, west side of Palmer Place, North Adelaide

- Location in greater Adelaide
- 34°54′37″S 138°35′36″E
- Location: 36-40 Palmer Place, North Adelaide, South Australia
- Country: Australia
- Denomination: Anglican
- Website: ccna.asn.au

History
- Status: Church
- Founded: 20 December 1849
- Founder: Bishop Augustus Short
- Consecrated: 1849

Architecture
- Functional status: Active
- Architects: Henry Stuckey; William Weir
- Architectural type: Church
- Style: Romanesque Revival

Specifications
- Materials: Limestone mined from Palmer Place; Slate roof tiles from Willunga

Administration
- Province: South Australia
- Diocese: Adelaide

Clergy
- Archbishop: Brad Billings
- Rector: Stephen James Bloor

South Australian Heritage Register
- Official name: Christ Church (Anglican), North Adelaide; Christ Church Rectory (Anglican)
- Type: State heritage (complex / group)
- Designated: 28 May 1981
- Reference no.: 10866
- Subject index: Religion - Church (Christian)
- Class: State

Christ Church, North Adelaide, often written Christchurch, is an Anglican church in North Adelaide, South Australia.

== History ==
Acre 745 was the original name of the plot between Jeffcott Street and 36-40 Palmer Place, North Adelaide, a suburb immediately north of Adelaide city centre. The foundation stone was laid on 1 June 1848 by Augustus Short, the first Anglican Bishop of Adelaide, and the church was consecrated in 1849. Christ Church was the pro-cathedral until 1877 when St Peter's Cathedral opened.

In 1850 a parsonage was built on the southern half of Acre 745 It became the deanery for Dean Marryat in 1887, then a rectory from 1906.

In 1868 a site on Jeffcott Street opposite the church was purchased for a schoolroom. The foundation stone was laid on 26 September.

== Architecture ==
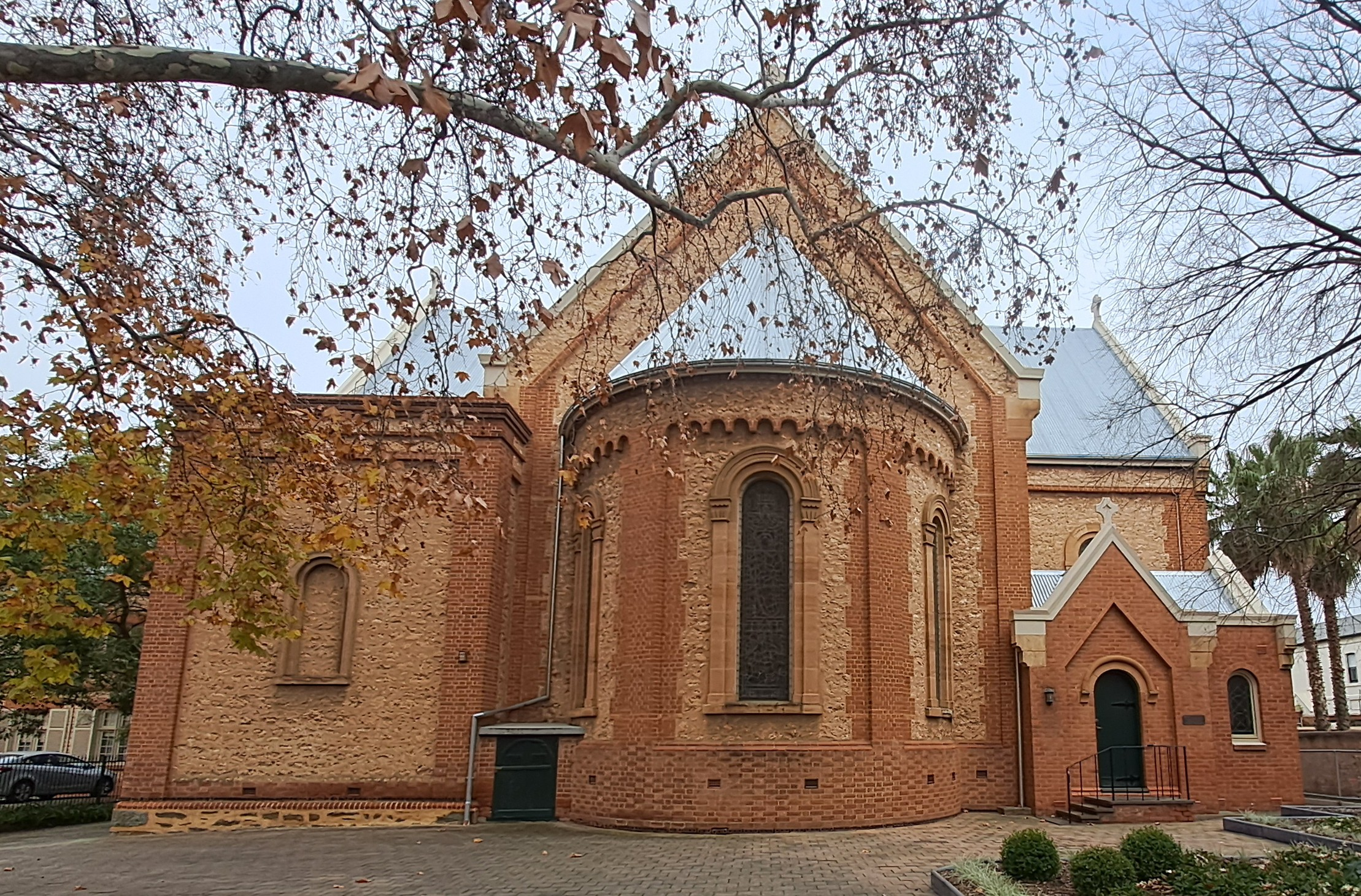
Front view of the church, 2025

The church building is in the Romanesque Revival architectural style and was built under the direction of architects Henry Stuckey and William Weir. It is built of local limestone mined from Palmer Place, with slate roof tiles from Willunga. In 1855 the nave was extended on the western side by some 50 feet (15 m).

Stuckey was also responsible for designing a number of other Church of England churches and other buildings in the colony, including at Hindmarsh (now Holden Street Theatres), Port Lincoln, Clare (St Barnabas), Penwortham (St Mark's), Port Adelaide (St Paul's), Beaumont Rectory, Walkerville Rectory, and St Peter’s Church at Glenelg. He also designed two buildings at St Peter's College, and Pirie Street Wesleyan Church.

The church, rectory, and hall are all heritage-listed with the former two appearing on the South Australian Heritage Register and the latter appearing on a "local" list maintained by the City of Adelaide.

== Organ ==
The church's first instrument was a harmonium, replaced in 1854 by the pipe organ from J. B. Graham's mansion Prospect House ("Graham's Castle"), and opened by George Bennett, one of his last performances. The new acquisition was heavily criticised, then refurbished and greatly enlarged the following year. It still had faults: it was so badly affected by weather that in winter it took six kerosene lamps burning for an hour before it would play.

A new organ was purchased from August Gern (Note: "Augustus Gurm" in the newspaper report) of London and the old one bought by organist James Shakespeare.

It was later installed in the Norwood Baptist Church where it served until replaced by J. E. Dodd in 1884.

C. J. Stevens served as organist from 1887

== Liturgy ==
Worship in the church follows the Book of Common Prayer.

== People ==
=== Priests ===
- John Woodcock (1849–1868)
- Charles Marryat (1868–1906)
- George Jose (1907–1933)
- Charles Murray (1933–1938)
- Arthur Leslie Bulbeck (1938–1957)
- George Benjamin McWilliams (1957–1965)
- Richard Mellon Southey (1966–1973)
- Alexander Russell Cameron (1973–1990)
- John Paul Collas (1991–2002)
- Simon Bailey (2003–2007)
- Lyndon Brad Sulzberger (2007–2012)
- Keith Patrick Bric (2013-2020)
- Stephen James Bloor (2021-)

=== Others ===
- James Pollitt
- Henry Sparks
- W. A. Hughes
- Canon Wise (curate 1895–1897)

== See also ==
- List of Anglican churches in South Australia
- Australian non-residential architectural styles
