= Islington railway station =

Railway station in Adelaide, South Australia

Coordinates: 34°52′31″S 138°34′54″E

Islington
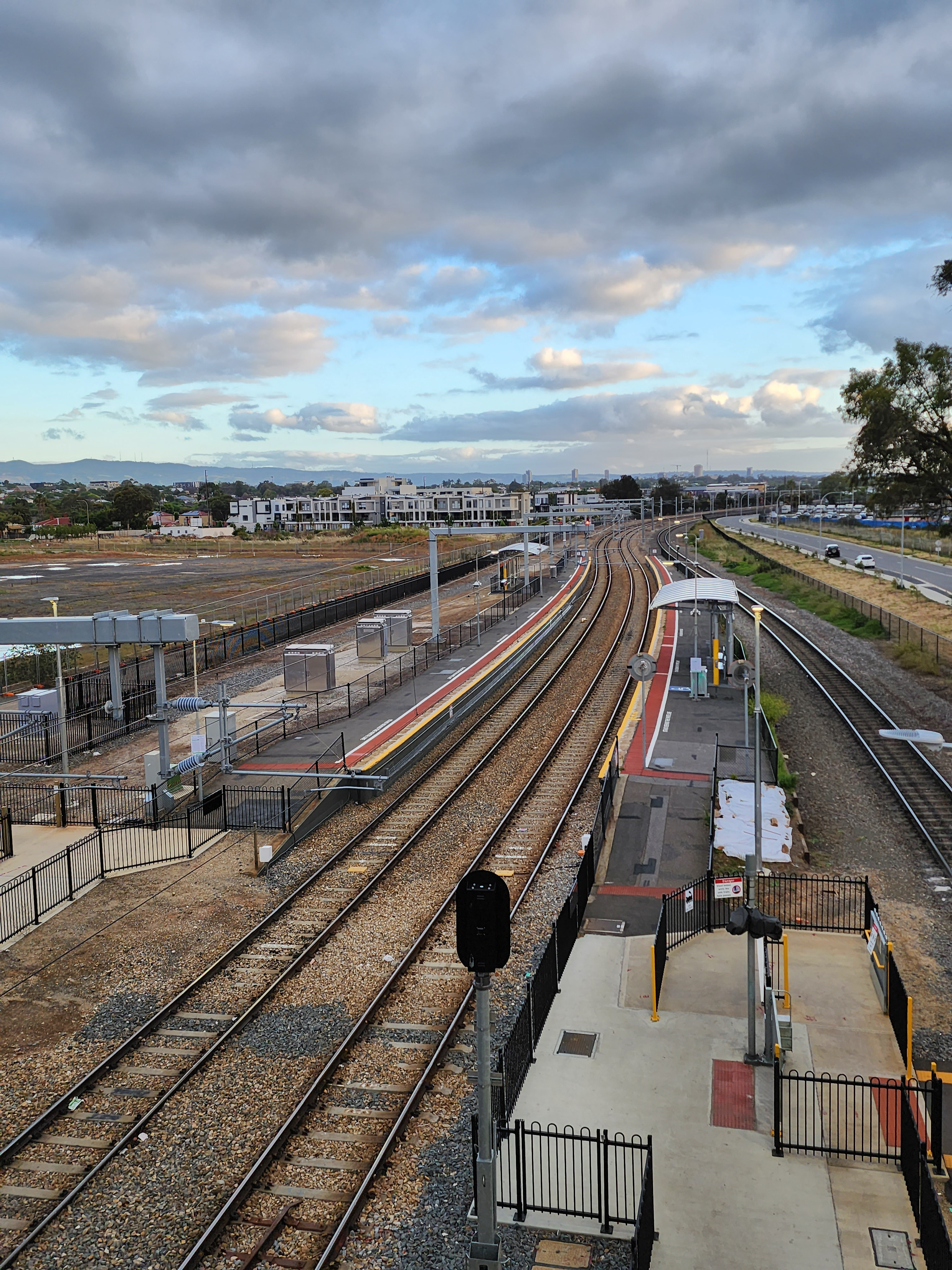
- Southbound view of the station platforms, November 2022

General information
- Location: Pedder Crescent, Prospect
- Owner: Department for Infrastructure & Transport
- Operator: Adelaide Metro
- Line: Gawler
- Distance: 6 kilometres (3.7 mi) from Adelaide
- Platforms: 2
- Connections: Bus

Construction
- Structure type: Ground
- Parking: On-street parking (Exeter Tce)
- Cycle facilities: No
- Accessible: Yes

Other information
- Station code: 16527 (to City); 18540 (to Gawler Central)

History
- Rebuilt: 12 June 2022

Services
Preceding station	Adelaide Metro	Following station
Dudley Park towards Adelaide	Gawler line	Kilburn towards Gawler Central
Location

Islington railway station is located on the Gawler line. Situated in the inner northern Adelaide suburb of Prospect adjacent to Regency Road, it is 6.0 kilometres (3.7 mi) from the Adelaide railway station.

== History ==
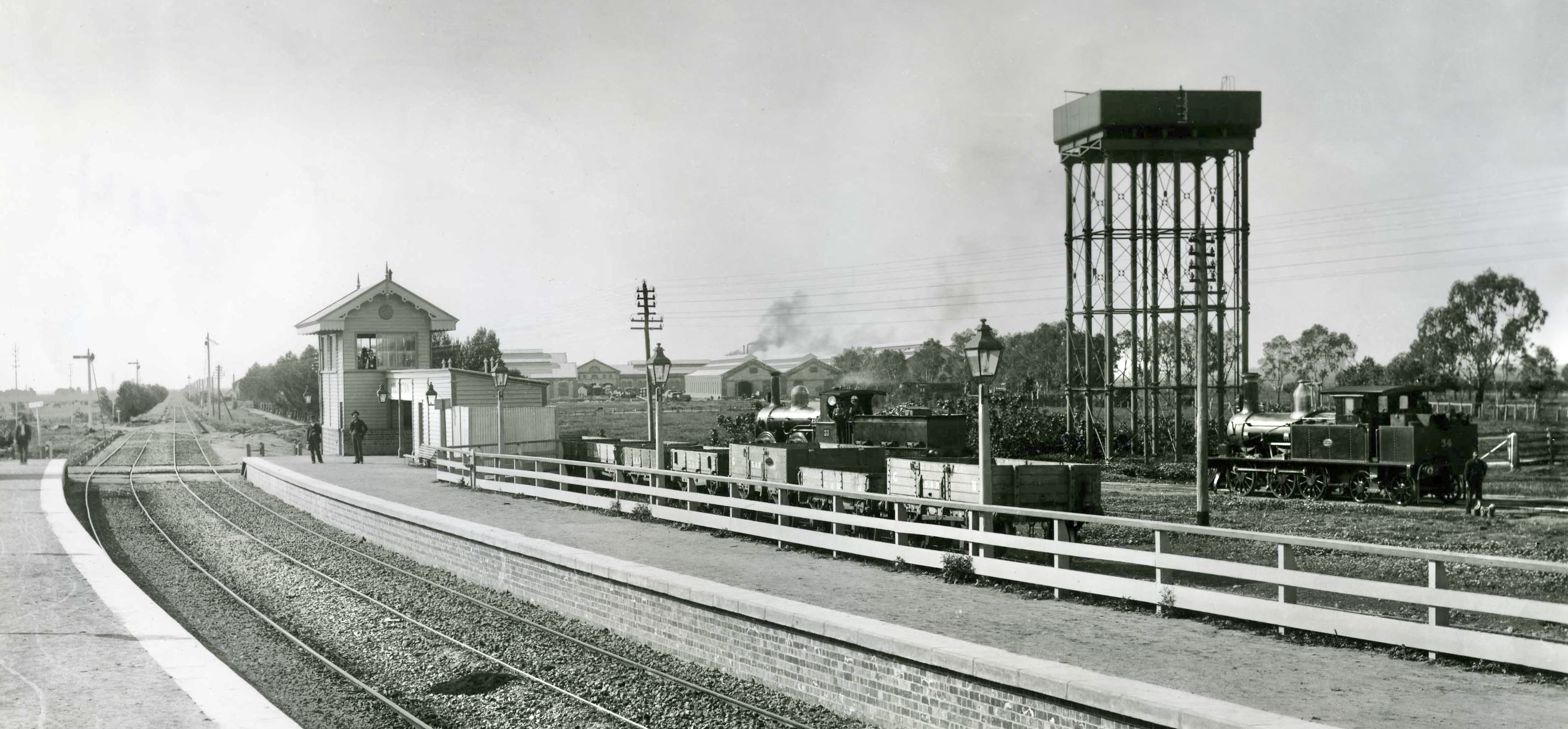
Islington railway station, looking north, in 1891 soon after duplication of the line to Gawler

Islington station was opened in December 1856 as part of the Gawler Town railway line.

North of the station lie the Islington Railway Workshops, once owned by the South Australian Railways and now by rail-related specialist companies. To the west of the station lies the Australian Rail Track Corporation's 1435 mm (4 ft 8 1/2 in) standard-gauge line to Crystal Brook; trains on this track do not stop at Islington. On the eastern side of the station lay a road–rail transfer yard with which TNT and Holden were involved. The yard had closed by the late 1990s and remained unused until 2008, when it was completely cleared to make way for a new residential development. In 2014, decontamination of the site commenced.

The station was refurbished in early 2022 during electrification works on the Gawler line. The refurbishment of the station included platform resurfacing, new shelters, seating, way-finding and lighting.

== Services by platform ==
Islington station has two single-face platforms to handle passenger traffic for Adelaide Metro's Gawler line services; these are 1600 mm (5 ft 3 in) broad gauge. It is a designated a high-frequency station, with trains scheduled every 15 minutes on weekdays, between 7:30am and 6:30pm.

Platform	Destination
1	Gawler and Gawler Central
2	Adelaide

The station is also served by Adelaide Metro's route 300 Suburban Connector bus at Stop 15 Regency Road.
