= Joshua Ives =

Musician and university professor

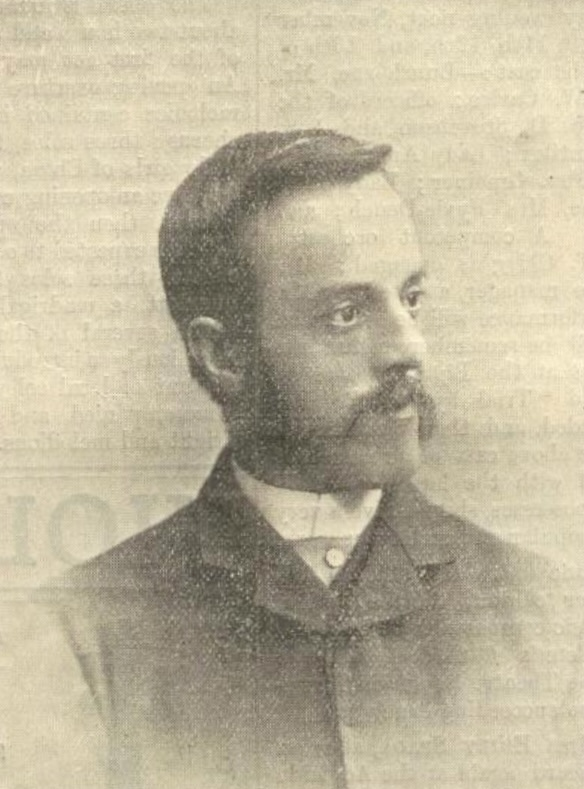
Joshua Ives in 1896

Joshua Ives (2 May 1854 – 16 June 1931) was the first Professor of Music at the University of Adelaide and founder of the Elder Conservatorium of Music.

== History ==
Ives was born at Hyde, Greater Manchester, the sixth son of Hannah Ives, née Goddard and her husband Joseph Ives, a furniture dealer. He was educated at the Commercial School and Owens College, Manchester, and studied music under (later Sir) Frederick Bridge and Henry Hiles. At age 16 he became assistant organist at All Saints, Manchester (perhaps All Saints Anglican Church, Bury), and two years later was appointed to St James, Gorton, but soon afterwards left for a better position and a finer organ at St Andrews, Manchester (perhaps St Andrews Anglican Church at Ramsbottom, Bury). He moved to St Stephens, Hulme, where he had a large choir. In 1881 he entered Queens' College, Cambridge, and in 1883 received his Mus. Bac. He was appointed organist at the Established Church in Anderston, Glasgow, also lectured on Harmony and Musical Composition at the Glasgow Athenaeum. See List of churches in Greater Manchester

It was due to the enthusiasm of the Governor of South Australia, Sir William Robinson, an accomplished musician, and to W. R. Cave's sponsorship, that the University of Adelaide was the first in Australia to offer a degree in music. In order to achieve this, he raised subscriptions totalling £5,000 over five years to employ a Professor of Music, and of 19 applicants in 1884 Joshua Ives was selected and took up the position in March 1885. He was also to replace T. H. Jones as City Organist; his first recital at the newly enlarged Town Hall instrument was on 9 April 1885, and was well, if not ecstatically, received.

As there were insufficient funds to found a Chair in Music, and those promised were only for five years, potential students were warned that there was no guarantee of continuation of the course beyond this time, however this failed to diminish the enthusiasm of students and 25 were enrolled for the first year, mostly females. Ives had demanded concessions on matriculation requirements; although not dropped entirely as was the case at Oxford and Cambridge, it was less demanding (presumably omitting the Classical language — Latin and Greek — requirement). And the matriculation examinations could be undertaken at any time prior to awarding the Music degree. This had the unfortunate effect that many otherwise successful students never graduated.

The financial position was unsupportable, and other sources of funds were sought, and Professor Ives instituted a scheme of public examinations, the first in Australia, the fees of which were used to support the Chair. The examinations, modelled on those of the Guildhall School of Music in London, became very popular and not only contributed largely to the faculty's finances, but led directly to an improvement in the standard of teaching in the colony. Sir Thomas Elder died in 1897, and bequeathed £20,000 to endow the Chair permanently, but as financial needs were being covered by examination fees, it was decided to establish a Conservatorium of Music, using L. G. Reimann's College of Music in Wakefield Street as a nucleus. The Conservatorium was established in 1898; additional temporary premises were secured and additional staff hired. Ives was appointed Director, with a salary increase of £200 and for a term of three years. A partnership was entered into between the University of Adelaide and the Associated Board of the Royal College of Music and with the Royal Academy of Music in London in order that qualifications gained in South Australia were recognised elsewhere. These links greatly enhanced the status in Australia of the Associated Board, which was hitherto almost unknown. After around 10 years the connection with the Associated Board was relinquished, and a partnership was formed with Melbourne University, forming the basis of the Australian Music Examinations Board.

While in Adelaide he served as Conductor of the Philharmonic Society and was a prolific composer, for organ especially. He served as Organist and Choirmaster at the North Adelaide Baptist Church 1891–1896. The church, which had invested in a particularly fine organ, pleaded with him not to leave but he was adamant and a replacement was found in Louis Yemm.

Ives was well known as a speculator on the Stock Exchange, and not averse to litigation: when "Harry" Evans's clever satirical weekly Quiz recounted some quite pungent gossip about his (as "the organ-grinder"; the "hurdy gurdy man") rocky relationship with the stockbrokers of the city, he was quick to sue for libel. He was the subject of complaints from music teachers who felt their students were being unfairly treated in examinations, particularly as compared with Conservatorium students; the standard of Conservatorium teaching was criticised by external examiners. When the new building, incorporating the Elder Hall, was opened in 1900, Ives was given scant recognition. His contract was not renewed when it fell due in 1901. Ives resigned and moved to Victoria. His farewell speech, which was largely boycotted by academic staff, but well received by students, poured contumely on the Chancellor, Sir Samuel Way, and his "henchman" Dr W. Barlow, the Vice-Chancellor. He was vindicated in some of the criticisms that were levelled against him. And Ives's claim that the University sabotaged his arrangements to have his concerto performed were supported by Charles Cawthorne, manager for Heinicke's Grand Orchestra, who were to have performed the work. The post of City Organist was in 1891 awarded to William Richard Pybus, in preference to T. H. Jones, one of Ives's supporters, though more experienced (he was the previous incumbent) and arguably the better musician. Ives's replacement at the Conservatorium was Dr J. Matthew Ennis from February 1902. Of Ives's staff and colleagues, Immanuel Gotthold Reimann (c. 1858–1932), from whose School of Music the Conservatorium was formed, was its most durable member.

Victoria

He accepted the post of organist and choir master of the Yarra Presbyterian Church, St Kilda Road in 1903. He wrote articles for the Melbourne Herald.

He developed a reputation as an excellent judge of musical performance, and officiated at music competitions from Bendigo, Prahran, Geelong, Hamilton and Horsham to places far away as Launceston, Dunedin, New Zealand and Boulder, Western Australia. In 1920 he was brought back to Adelaide, to adjudicate at the Peace Exhibition in 1920.

He opened a teaching studio at 271 Collins Street. In 1907 he was appointed to Bendigo's new Conservatorium of Music.

== Family ==
He married Janet Boyd on 3 December 1879. While in Adelaide they lived in Gilles Street East. Mrs Ives left for Scotland in January 1899 with her daughters. It is possible they never returned to Australia.

He left property valued at around £3,350 to his partner Sarah Howard, otherwise known as Sarah Jane Ives (died 9 December 1943) and to his daughter Sadie, who married Robert Cooper.

His home in Victoria was in New Street, Brighton then Ermington Street, Kew.

== Compositions ==
- Symphonie Australien for organ and orchestra, first performed at the University in honour of the Duke and Duchess of Cornwall on 22 July 1901.
