= E. Harold Davies =

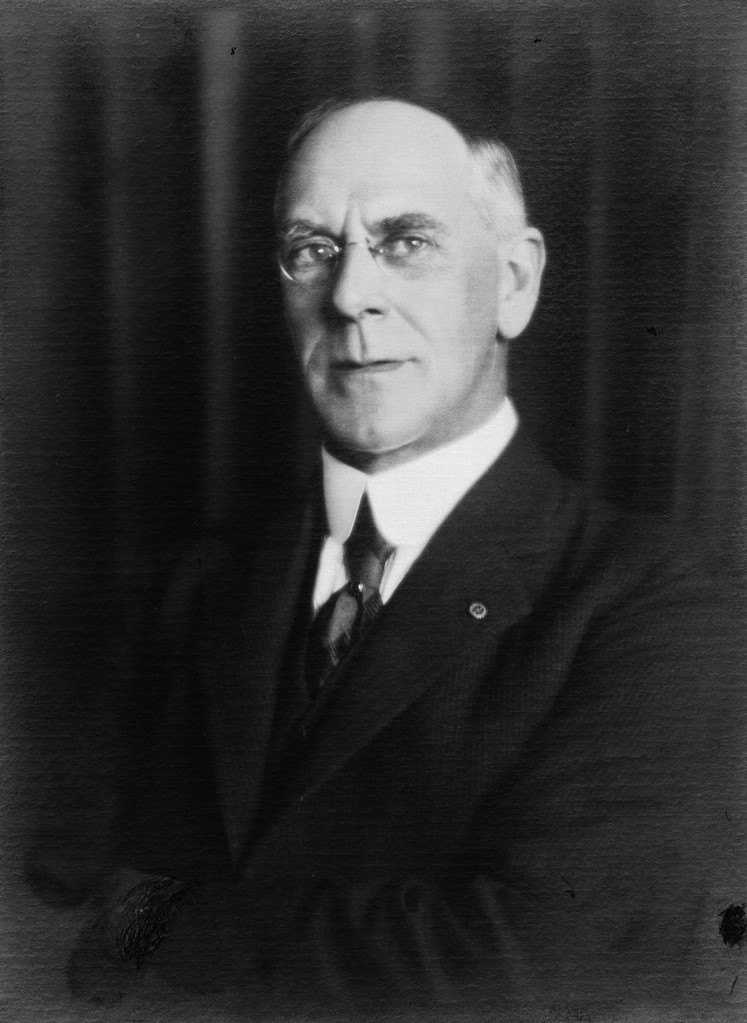

Edward Harold Davies, generally referred to as E. Harold Davies) (18 July 1867 — 1 July 1947) was professor of music at the University of Adelaide, Principal of the Elder Conservatorium, and brother of Sir Walford Davies.

Harold was the third of four sons of John Whitridge Davies of Oswestry on the English-Welsh border. He emigrated to Australia in 1886, returned to England in 1890 where he was appointed organist at the Chapel Royal, then returned to Australia where he founded the South Australia Orchestra (later to become the Adelaide Symphony Orchestra) and played a leading role in the teaching and examination of music.

He enrolled in the Bachelor of Music degree at Adelaide University in 1883 after graduating and requested that the university prepare regulations for the degree of Doctor in Music. In 1902 was the first to obtain this degree from an Australian university.

Davies was in his time a choir leader, conductor, critic, promoter, teacher and organist. He was also a radio commentator and a noted recorder of indigenous music.

In 1925, before the Australian Broadcasting Corporation was established, he was on the University Council's broadcasting subcommittee and organized bi-weekly music broadcasts from Elder Hall. Later, Davies became a regular on the ABC, discussing music and other topics like philosophy and ethics.

Between 1927 and 1930, he joined the University Anthropological Society, journeying to Central Australia and Eyre Peninsula for Aboriginal studies. His role was to document Aboriginal songs. His published notebooks showcased him as a trailblazer in Australian ethnomusicology, earning him membership in the Royal Society of South Australia.

In 1930 He co-founded the formation of the Music Teachers Association of South Australia.

In 1933, Davies edited "The Children's Bach", a collection of 20 simple Bach pieces for piano, selected mostly from the Clavier-Book for Anna Magdalena. Beloved by both music students and teachers, the collection is still in print.

Davies was Elder Professor of Music and Director of the Elder Conservatorium from 1919 until his death in 1947.

== Sources ==
- Colles, H. C. Walford Davies, 1942
- biography at Australian Dictionary of Biography
