= Gotthold Reimann =

Australian pianist and teacher of music (1859–1932)

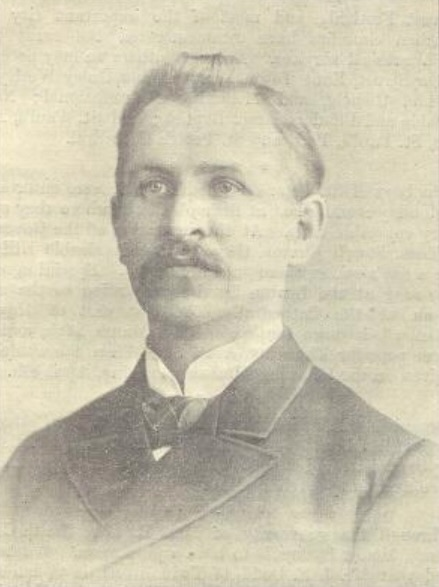
Gotthold Reimann in 1897

Immanuel Gotthold Reimann RAM, CMB (13 January 1859 – 19 March 1932), generally known as I. G. Reimann or Gotthold Reimann, was a South Australian musician and teacher of music. He founded the Adelaide College of Music, which became the Elder Conservatorium.

== History ==
Reimann was born in Hahndorf, South Australia, second son of Bertha Leontine Reimann, née Schröder, and (Karl Friedrich) Eduard Reimann, a farmer, who arrived in South Australia on the Emmy from Hamburg in January 1850. He began studying singing and piano under T. W. Boehm at his Hahndorf Academy, and Mrs. B. J. Price. He studied under Otto Stange in the early 1870s and by 1875 was teaching at the Hahndorf Academy, and in Adelaide the following year. In 1880 he went to Berlin, where he undertook further studies with Theodor Kullak and Hans Bischoff, and later at the Berlin Conservatorium under Xaver Scharwenka.

He returned to Adelaide, and in October 1883 opened his Adelaide College of Music with 10 students, and in the years before it closed had 250 students.

During its 14 years of operation, Reimann encouraged several German musicians to move to South Australia, and helped teach at the School. Two were to stay and contribute greatly to the musical life of the young colony: Hermann Heinicke (1863–1949), violinist and founder of Heinicke's Grand Orchestra and first conductor of the Conservatorium orchestra, and 'cellist Hermann Kugelberg (c. 1867–1950). In 1889 he appointed C. J. Sharp as his co-director.

Joshua Ives was brought out from England in 1885 to initiate the Bachelor of Music course for the University of Adelaide. In 1898 Reimann accepted Ives's offer to merge his college into the about-to-be-formed Elder Conservatorium of Music, forming its nucleus, with Reimann appointed as deputy-director and teacher of piano. And for the first two years of its existence the Conservatorium was located at the old College premises in Wakefield Street.

When the Australian Music Examinations Board was jointly founded by Adelaide and Melbourne Universities and later was adopted by the other States. Reimann was not only a delegate to the board, and one of its principal examiners, but he was also the editor and annotator of most of its publications.

== Other interests ==
He was organist at the Lutheran Church, Flinders Street from 1891, using a Backmann organ he brought back from Germany, and held that position until his death.

== Family ==
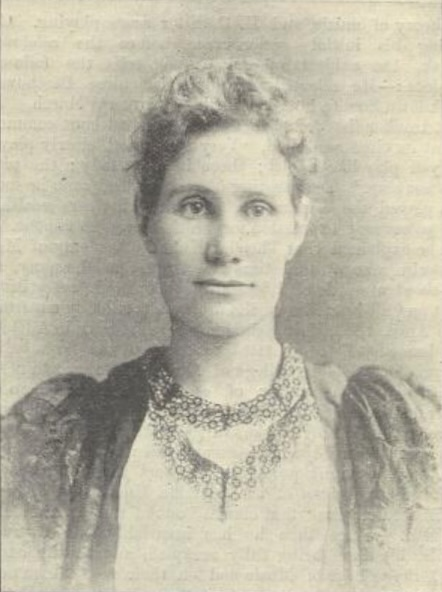
Johanne Marie Reimann in 1897

Reimann married his student Johanne Marie Lührs (1862–1945) on 20 December 1883. Their children included:

- Carelen Edward "Karey" Reimann (1887– )
- Valesca Leonore Olive Reimann MA (1888–1964), taught at Trinity College, Kandy, Ceylon, now Sri Lanka for 30 years; author of All the Gangways Are Up ed. Peter Reimann 2014, Wellington NZ. Never married.
- Hilda Marie Reimann (1892–1977), violinist with South Australian Symphony Orchestra. Never married.
- Dr. Arnold Luehrs Reimann DSc (1898–1961) married Doris Rita Bradley on 11 June 1927; born with physical disability, he was a noted scientist and fine 'cellist.

They had a home on William Street, Norwood.
