= Anton Riebe =

South Australian artist

Anton David Riebe (7 October 1904 – 11 April 1987) was a South Australian artist who painted mainly landscapes in oils and watercolours. His artworks are held by the National Gallery of Australia, Art Gallery of South Australia, Tasmanian Museum and Art Gallery, Broken Hill City Art Gallery and the Australian Stock Exchange as well as in numerous private collections.

== Life and career ==
Riebe was born on 7 October 1904, in Cottesloe, Western Australia. He was the oldest son of Martin Riebe (1866–1941) and Ernestine Clara (née Wiesener) (1877–1964) who moved back from WA to SA in 1914. Martin and Ernestine Riebe were of German-Lutheran heritage from the Barossa Valley and they had four children (Gottfried Johannes "Erwin", Anton David, Linda Clara and Naemi "Ruth").

=== Education ===
Anton studied at the School of Fine Arts in Tynte Street, North Adelaide (1925–1927) and he won a two-year scholarship to study at the South Australian School of Arts and Crafts in the early 1930s. His principal teachers were Marie Tuck, Leslie Wilkie, Ivor Hele, Dorrit Black and Frederick Millward Grey. His contemporaries in South Australia included Kathleen Sauerbier, Rex Wood, Dora Chapman, Max Ragless and Horace Trenerry. He was later influenced by artists such as Hans Heysen and Len Annois.

=== Career ===
Anton Riebe earned his living as a signwriter and commercial artist and he worked at John Martin's Department Store for over forty years (1934–1975). One of his roles was as the chief designer for the John Martin's annual Christmas pageant floats. During WW2 he enlisted in the Australian Army (Citizen Military Force – Service Number S42233) becoming an accredited "camofleur" and worked for the Royal Australian Air Force creating camouflage in Darwin and northern Australia. For most of his life, Anton Riebe lived in the family home at 90 Young Street, Parkside with his father, Martin, (until his death in 1941) and mother, Ernestine Clara, (until her death in 1964) and his sister, Naemi "Ruth" (1918–2009), until they sold the house in 1966.

Anton Riebe was a prolific painter, primarily of landscapes, and particularly after World War 2. He was active from the 1930s until his death in 1987. He won the John Christie Wright Memorial Prize for Life Drawing in 1939 from the South Australian School of Art. He won third prize at the prestigious Dunlop National Art competition in Melbourne in 1951 and he was a finalist in 1954. He was a member of the Contemporary Art Society (CAS) in the 1940s. He was an associate member (from 1936), later a fellow and Council member (from 1939) of the Royal South Australian Society of Arts (RSASA). He was once described as "the poet of Port Willunga" by art critic Ian George.

Riebe regularly exhibited at RSASA exhibitions including in 1937, 1938, 1939 and 1954 later holding solo exhibitions at the RSASA Gallery in 1949 and 1954 and a memorial exhibition in 1988 after his death. Anton Riebe also exhibited for many years at the John Martin's Art Gallery where he held four solo exhibitions in 1946, 1950, 1952 and 1956. He exhibited at the Caltex Art Show held in the Civic Hall Reception Room at Port Lincoln in 1960. Later in his life Anton Riebe exhibited watercolours and oil paintings at the Osborne Art Gallery in Leigh Street where he was part of group exhibitions in 1966 and 1968. His work was included in an exhibition of Australian artists at Ingoldby Wines in McLaren Flat in October 1985. The Barry Newton Gallery had an exhibition of 80 oils and watercolours by the late Anton Riebe on behalf of Miss Ruth Riebe in September 1988. In August 1995 a new venture by Fine Art auctioneers Ian Bruce Pty. Ltd. in Pulteney Street called "The Gallery" opened with an exhibition of 92 sketches, watercolours and oils by Anton Riebe.

=== Death ===
Riebe never married and he was living at 17A George Street in Clarence Park before being admitted to the Repatriation Hospital where he died of prostate cancer, aged 82 years, on 11 April 1987. He left his entire estate to his younger sister Ruth and he is buried in Centennial Park Cemetery on the Lutheran Lawn (Path 19, Grave 572).

== Works ==
Anton Riebe's artworks are part of the permanent collections of the following institutions:

- Art Gallery of South Australia
