= Elizabeth Armstrong (artist) =

South Australian artist (1859–1930)

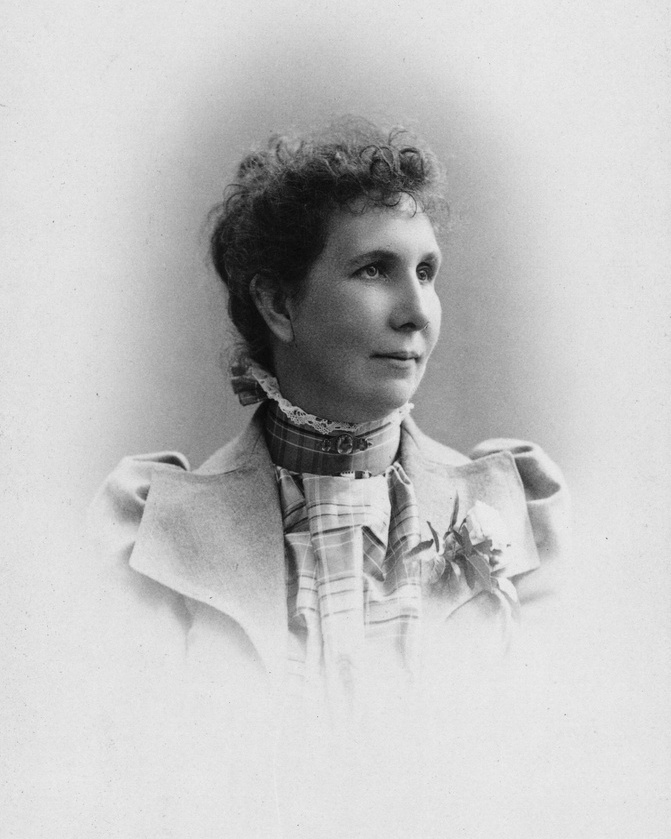
- Armstrong in 1898
- Born: September 28, 1859; Adelaide, Colony of South Australia
- Died: February 21, 1930 (aged 70); London, England
- Occupations: Artist and art teacher
- Years active: 1880–1929
- Known for: Floral paintings; extensive teaching career
- Notable work: Ranunculus, c.1903, Art Gallery of South Australia

Elizabeth Caroline Armstrong (28 September 1859 – 21 February 1930), known as Lizzie Armstrong, was an Australian artist and art teacher. She was the first in a long line of influential female art educators appointed to the South Australian School of Design (later known as the South Australian School of Art). According to one art historian, she was the first woman to hold a teaching post in a major Australian art school.

== Early life and training ==
Armstrong was born on 28 September 1859 in Adelaide, in the Colony of South Australia. She was the second daughter of James Armstrong, a mail guard, and his wife Mary Ann (née Stickley). The family lived at 141 Wakefield Street, Adelaide. In her early twenties, Lizzie Armstrong (as she was then known) was praised for watercolours entered in the Adelaide Exhibition in the Adelaide Town Hall in 1881.

From 1882, she studied under Louis Tannert, head of the School of Painting. Her works were among those chosen to represent the school in the 1887 Jubilee Exhibition in Adelaide and in the Melbourne Centennial Exhibition in 1888. Under Harry Pelling Gill, head of the School of Design, she took courses accredited by the National Art Training School, South Kensington (today the Royal College of Art), receiving the South Kensington art teacher certificate and a first-class certificate for still-life painting.

== Career ==
Gill proposed Armstrong as Painting Mistress in his plan to merge the two schools after Tannert’s resignation in 1892. He stressed her ability and qualifications and asserted the benefits of a female teacher for a largely female student body. Gill was made head of the School of Design and Painting, and Armstrong was appointed at a salary of £100 per annum, substantially lower than what Tannert had enjoyed as head of school. Her post commenced in February 1893.

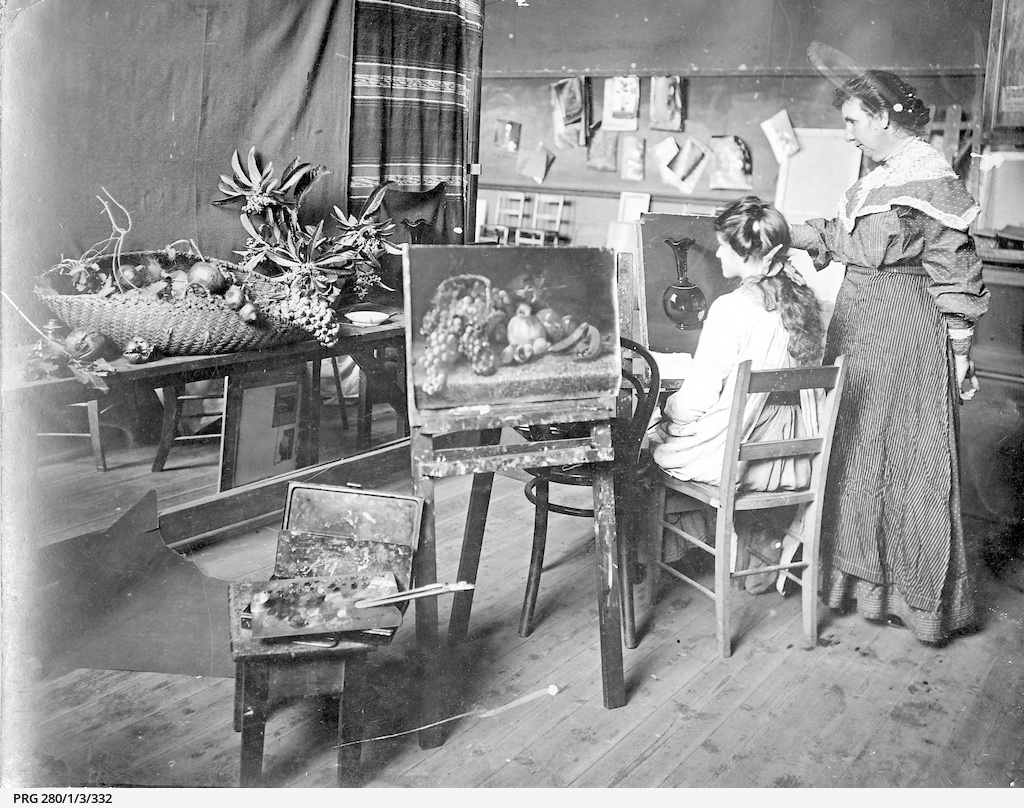
Elizabeth Armstrong instructing a pupil at the School of Design, 1905

Armstrong was the first in what art historian Catherine Speck has called the "long and distinguished tradition of employing women artists as educators" at the South Australian School of Arts and its predecessors. According to art historian Jenny Aland, she was the first woman to hold a teaching post in a major Australian art school.

Her students who went on to become teachers at that institution included Gladys Good, Margaret Kelly (later Walloschech), Beulah Leicester, Jessamine Buxton, Gwen Barringer, and Dora Chapman. Another student was Stella Bowen, whose oil painting of oleanders was one of the works from Armstrong’s still-life class that impressed critics in an exhibition in May 1912.

Armstrong exhibited floral paintings with success. Her Hollyhocks were among a number of paintings from South Australian artists sold in the 1898 Exhibition of Australian Art in London. She received praise for Wattle from Sunny New South Wales and Cosmos in the Society of Arts’ Federal Exhibition in the Institute Building in 1900. In 1903 her oil painting, Ranunculus, was hung in the Federal Exhibition and then purchased by the Art Gallery of South Australia. A gallery catalogue later described it as a ‘fine floral study’ and ‘one of the many successes that this artist has achieved’ in this genre. Catherine Speck suggests that Armstrong should be acknowledged as an early painter of Australian flora and refers to her ‘majestic’ Waratahs c.1906. Three of Armstrong’s paintings were included in the First Australian Exhibition of Women’s Work in Melbourne in 1907, and she continued to exhibit locally with distinction until her retirement.

Armstrong was the first female office-bearer in the Society of Arts, serving as Vice-President from 1923 to 1928 and as a member of its council for 26 years. She was also president of the Art Club, another society for exhibition and discussion, from 1918 to 1920.

From the end of 1913 until the end of 1914, she took leave-of-absence from her teaching post to visit art schools and galleries in London, France, Italy, and Russia. Subsequently, she delivered a number of lectures and talks on aspects of international art at the Art Gallery and to art groups.

Teaching was a vocation for Armstrong, and she did not end her employment at the School of Arts and Crafts until her seventieth birthday, the Education Department’s date for compulsory retirement. She had held the post for over thirty-six years.

== Death and commemorations ==
She died unexpectedly in England of a stroke on 21 February 1930, and her ashes were deposited a few months later in the grave of her nephew, William Rowland Fairweather, at West Terrace Cemetery in Adelaide.

At the School of Arts and Crafts prize-giving ceremony later that year, a portrait of Armstrong by her colleague and ex-student Beulah Leicester was unveiled. The school magazine reported at the end of 1930 that the portrait ‘now hangs in the Painting Room, which will always be remembered as Miss Armstrong’s room, and is a constant reminder, to those who knew and loved her, of her great kindliness and the charm of her presence’.

Students and staff of the School of Arts and Crafts designed and constructed the Elizabeth Armstrong Memorial Library out of European oak. It was opened in September 1936. When the Exhibition Building that had housed the School of Arts was demolished in 1962, the library was, according to Mary P. Harris, ‘the only symbol of our old Art school to be re-established, with its timeless memories, in the new Art school in Stanley Street, North Adelaide’.

== Notable works ==
Ranunculas, c.1903, Art Gallery of South Australia.

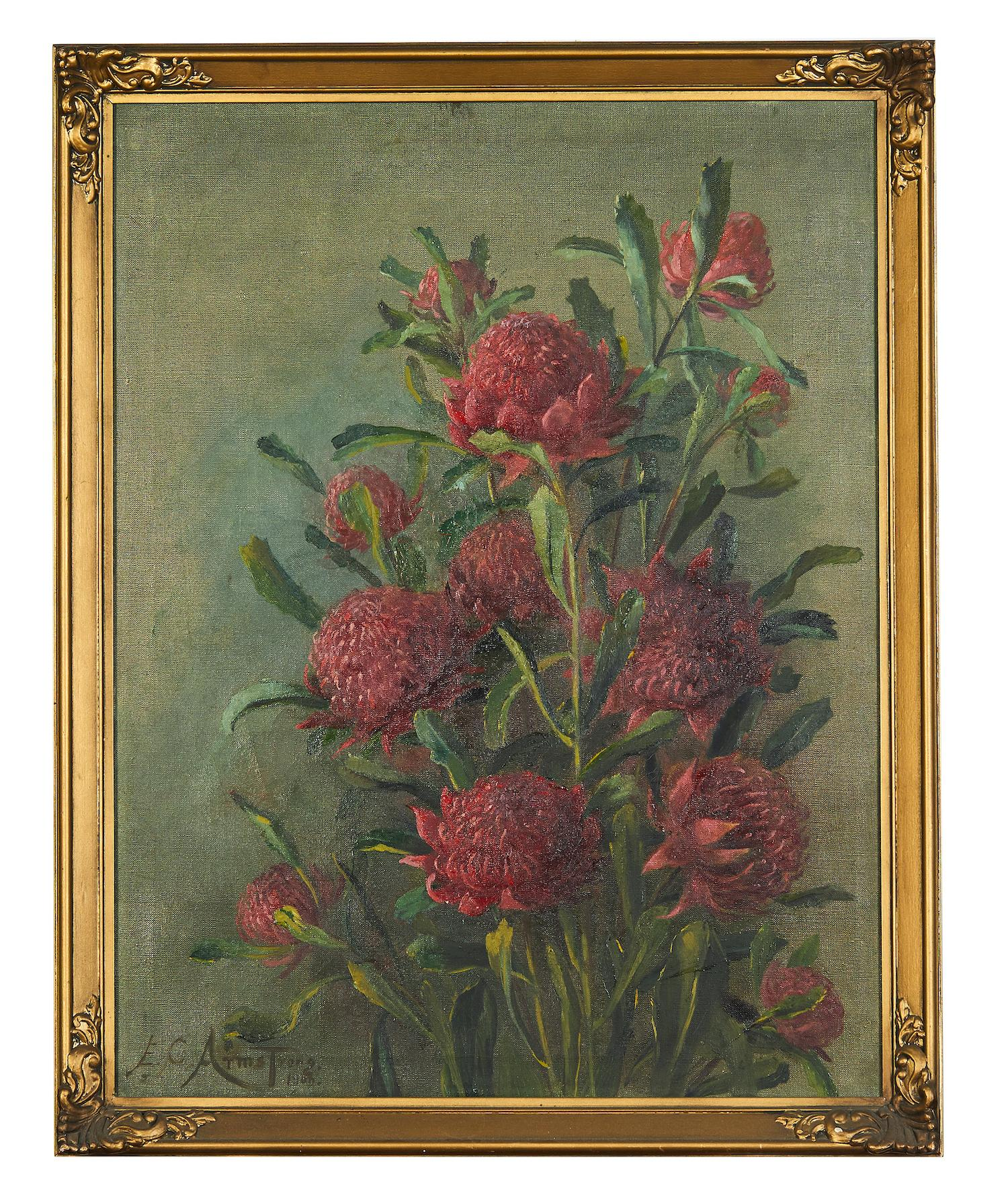
Waratahs, oil on canvas 1900

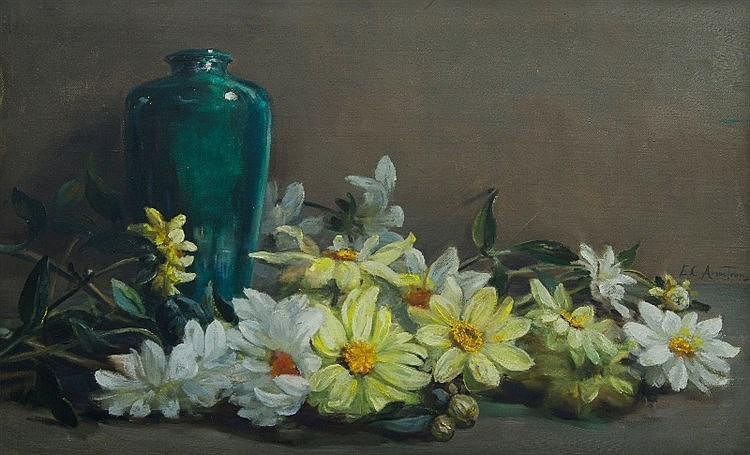
Dahlias, 1923
