= James Cant (artist) =

Australian artist (1911–1982)

James Montgomery Cant (27 November 1911 – 26 June 1982) was an Australian surrealist painter in oils and an art teacher.

== History ==
Cant was born in Elsternwick, Melbourne as the only child of James Cant (1882–1917) and Annie Cant, née Montgomery (1877–1968). In 1914 the family moved to Sydney, where Cant was educated at a variety of schools including, briefly, Sydney Grammar School. He attended Saturday morning art classes conducted by Antonio Dattilo-Rubbo, the East Sydney Technical College and Julian Ashton's Sydney Art School.

He was briefly influenced by Roy de Maistre, so when he moved to England in 1934 he renewed acquaintance, and became immersed in the modernist scene in London. He created numerous works: paintings, sculptures and assemblages that have been described as "the most avant-garde works of any Australian artist in the first half of the twentieth century" He exhibited with some of the foremost practitioners of the day, and made the acquaintance of Braque, Picasso, Magritte and Joan Mirò.

He returned to Sydney in 1939 and the following year held at the Macquarie Galleries a one-man exhibition, which one critic found banal and derivative. He enlisted with the Citizen Military Forces on 9 May 1941, serving with the Royal Australian Engineers in New South Wales and Queensland, and was promoted to WOII before being discharged on 18 May 1944. He worked for a time as display adviser to the Australian Museum, and made studies of Charles Mountford's photographs of Aboriginal rock paintings at Ubirr, painting a series of copies. In August 1949 Cant and Chapman left for England, where he exhibited his "rock art" paintings at London's Berkeley Galleries. They remained there for five years, Cant making surrealistic paintings of London street scenes, then returned to Australia, eventually settling in Adelaide, where he painted a series of landscapes, which were well received. Dora Chapman, his wife, found paid employment teaching 1955–1969 at the South Australian School of Art, where Cant also taught part-time, hampered by ill-health. By the early 1970s he was unable to work, crippled with multiple sclerosis but, cared for by Chapman, survived to 26 June 1982. His remains were buried at the Willunga Uniting Cemetery, as were Dora Chapman's.

== Personal ==
Cant married laboratory assistant Noeline Woodard on 4 March 1942. They divorced in 1945 and on 30 June that year he married again, to Dora Cecil Chapman (24 March 1911 – 15 May 1995). They had no children. Cant's father was killed in WWI; Cant's mother died in Adelaide in 1968 and was also buried at Willunga Uniting Cemetery.

== SORA ==
In 1945 Cant and Chapman joined the Communist Party of Australia, and established the Studio of Realist Art (SORA) with Hal Missingham, Roy Dalgarno and Roderick Shaw, on the principle of social realism, that art should be concerned with real-life issues and not idealised abstractions.

The studio started out in a cellar at 171 Sussex Street, Sydney, and within a few months had 74 members and 50 students. By July 1945 it had moved to 3rd-floor premises at 214 George Street and enrolled its 100th member. Students were charged £1 for a course of ten lessons. The studio held an exhibition at David Jones' gallery in August 1947: exhibitors included Cant, Dalgarno, Missingham, Shaw, J. Bergner, Herbert McClintock, Vic O'Connor, James V. Wigley, Roland Wakelin, Olive Long, Frank Medworth, and Oscar Edwards.

SORA mounted several exhibitions of paintings by Aboriginal artists, to mixed reviews, reflecting on both the quality of the work and the principle of encouraging adoption of European idioms by Aboriginal communities.

Attacks on organisations associated with communism increased in the late 1940s, not only to SORA, but extending to the Mosman Spastic Centre and Sydney New Theatre, which was then staging Ben Jonson's, The Alchemist. An exhibition at David Jones' gallery in August 1949 was closed peremptorily after criticism by the Sydney Morning Herald of the subject matter of some works. Reasons given for the cancellation include its being opened by Jessie Street and one key painting depicting a mass of people being led by a red flag, to the show being a distraction from the store's displays of up-market clothing.

No reports of further activity have been found. It was in August 1949 that Cant and Chapman left for England.
