= Dora Chapman =

Australian artist (1911–1995)

Dora Cecil Chapman (24 March 1911 – 15 May 1995), also known as Dora Cant, was a pre and post-war artist and art teacher who painted landscapes, still-life and portraits in oils, watercolours, gouache and acrylics. She created etchings and prints and was also an accomplished silks-screen printer and potter. A resident of South Australia, New South Wales and England, she was concerned with changing society through social realist art.

== Biography ==
=== Early life ===
Dora Cecil Chapman was born on 24 March 1911 at Mount Barker, South Australia. She was the daughter of Henry Bruce Chapman (1877–1952), a registered land agent, and Ida Florence Pearl Chapman, née Jackson, (1886–1975) who married at St James Church, Blakiston, SA on 17 July 1907. She was their oldest daughter (her only sister was Margaret) and she had five brothers (Harry, Jack, Douglas, Clifford and Roland).

Dora was “artistic” from a young child being dressed as “Miss Japan” in a costume competition at the Mount Barker Australia Day celebrations as early as 1917 and dressed as a “queen of bowers” in the Children’s Red Cross car procession at Mount Barker in 1918.

=== Education ===
Dora Chapman attended the Mount Barker Primary School (1917–23) and Mount Barker High School (1924–27). In her final year at the Mount Barker High School, the headmaster Mr. J. E. Smith noticed her talent for drawing and encouraged her to apply for a scholarship to study at the South Australian School of Arts and Crafts (SASAC) in Adelaide.

Dora spent three years on scholarship at the School of Arts and Crafts (1928–30) in Adelaide. On completion of her studies she worked for some time in her father’s office, which allowed her to remain at the school for two more years (1931–32). Her main teachers and tutors at this time were Louis McCubbin, Dorrit Black, Leslie Wilkie and Marie Tuck. Dora achieved excellent results in her art studies, often achieving credits and honors and sometimes topping her class, particularly in drawing and painting. She was a SASAC prizewinner in 1929 and won the John Christie Wright Prize for figure drawing. Her fellow students included Ivor Hele, John Dowie, Ivor Francis, Ruth Tuck, Vi Johns and Douglas Welsh. She joined the United Arts Club where students could sketch from life.

Some of her earliest artworks, dating from 1930, clearly show her prodigious talent including landscapes in oils, portrait drawings in charcoal and life drawings in pastels. Also in 1930, for example, she won prizes in the needlework and painting sections of the Mount Barker Show, at SASA she won second prize in the Gill Medal competition for excellence in design and workmanship among technical art students for a silk-shawl (brush-batik) work and at the All Australian Exhibition where she received an honourable mention in a competition to apply a design based on a plant study in any medium. Later in 1933 she won cookery competitions organised by the Housewives Association. Clearly her talents and abilities as a young woman were across a wide range of “artist” endeavours.

Dora lived with her parents in Verdun Street in North Kensington while studying and she maintained an active social life including being on the committee of the Trianon (dance) Club. Dora, unlike many young women of the time, could drive a car and in December 1932 she accompanied her parents on a three-week trip to Sydney where they “will travel by motor and Miss Chapman will relieve her father at the wheel”.

=== Early exhibitions ===
In December 1933 Dora and some other SASAC students including Douglas Welsh held an exhibition of their artworks in Edments Building where almost all of the works sold and some commissions were placed. Then in 1935 she held her first solo exhibition of 37 works at the Myer “Apollo” Dining Hall in Adelaide with her still life images deemed most successful. As well as paintings, she exhibited hand-weaving and some well-modelled pottery which gave "further evidence of her artistic ability". From 1935 she exhibited with the Royal South Australian Society of Arts (RSASA) and was elected an associate member while still a student. In 1940 Chapman was awarded the RSASA's Alex Melrose Prize which was to "stimulate figurative painting". Judged by McCubbin and Hans Heysen, Chapman won with a "hard but striking self-portrait". During this period Dora was appointed as art teacher at the private Stawell Girls' School at Mount Lofty where she taught art and crafts to all grades at the school.

=== SORA – Studio of Realist Art ===
In 1942 she joined the Australian Women's Army Service and achieved the rank of Sergeant. She worked for the Army Education Service in Adelaide, Melbourne and later Sydney as a librarian, organiser of exhibitions and lecturer on art between 1942 and 1945 including establishing a Fine Art Print Library and organising an art exhibition of work by army personnel. While in Sydney in 1944 she became very sick with a thyroid problem that required surgery. She met, and on 30 June 1945, at the age of 34 years, she married Sydney artist James Cant, the same year that she joined the Communist Party. They had no children.

She was a founder with James Cant, Hal Missingham, Bernard Smith, Roderick Shaw and Roy Dalgarno of the Studio of Realist Art (SORA) in Sydney in 1946. She was the secretary from 1946 to 1949, gave drawing lessons and established a library at SORA's premises and organised and participated in exhibitions. During this time her subjects were mainly semi-abstract landscapes, still-life and occasional portraits.

=== Later exhibitions ===
In 1950 James and Dora went to London and remained there for five years, also visiting France and Italy. After returning to Australia in 1955 they spent time in Adelaide and in 1956, under the name Dora C. Cant, she exhibited four works (two Abstract Enamels, a Life Study and an oil painting of Port Willunga lent by Mrs F. Nora? Burden) in the SASAC Staff exhibition. They returned to Sydney briefly and then in 1957 moved permanently to Adelaide. Chapman lectured full-time at the SA School of Art (SASA = the former SASAC was renamed SASA in 1958) from 1958 to 1969 and then part-time until 1974. She exhibited two oil paintings (Goats and Sisters) in the SASA Staff exhibition in October 1959. One of a small, but growing number of Australian women art critics for news periodicals she wrote for the Adelaide Advertiser during these years and in 1961 she was awarded the Melrose Prize for portraiture for the second time.

Her works were exhibited regularly at Australian galleries including 12 works in a joint exhibition with James Cant at the Hahndorf Gallery in 1959, 40 small works at the Myer Gallery in 1962, and acrylics, gouaches and serigraphs at the Lidums Art Gallery in Beaumont, SA in 1972. Then 29 works at the City of Hamilton Gallery in Victoria in 1971, another joint exhibition with James Cant of painting, prints and pots at the Lyceum Club in 1976 and a solo exhibition at the Bonython – Meadmore Gallery (BMG) in Adelaide in 1987. Her final exhibition (with Fred Williams) shortly before her death was at the Artstok Gallery in Sydney in 1994. She also contributed to many joint exhibitions over the years.

=== Living in South Australia ===
James and Dora Cant lived in 3 Park Road, Kensington Park for many years (1959 until her death in 1995). They are known to have visited the Willunga District from the late 1950s. It has been suggested that they may have regularly stayed in Willunga and perhaps from as early as 1962 they may have rented 13 St Peters Terrace from the owner Penbertha Alice Pointon, who died in 1964. On 9 January 1965 they purchased Heysed’s Cottage (Somerset) at 13 St Peters Terrace, Willunga from Ms. Pointon’s executors as their second home in the country (pied-a-terre or holiday house). They spent some time here in the late 1960s and became interested in the old Courthouse and Police Station in the High Street. Dora and James saw it as a possible permanent public gallery for James’ paintings. They approached the National Trust of South Australia and the District Council of Willunga but neither organisation would bear the expenditure for restoration and the ongoing operational costs. When James Cant died in 1982, Dora inherited the property. When Dora died in 1995 the property was bequeathed to the National Trust of SA, it was restored and subsequently returned to private ownership.

=== Final years and death ===
From about 1969 Dora became interested in representing aspects of human character, rather than individuals, and produced a series of silkscreens in the form of stylised, female portrait heads, some named after Australian native plants. After her retirement she began to produce serigraphs like The Girl With A Long Nose (1970, NGA) and Katinka (1973, p.c.), and silk-screen printing remained a major interest.

She had retired from full-time work at SASA in 1969 at the age of 58 but continued to teach part-time until 1974. Plagued by dementia late in life, Dora Chapman, aged 84 years, died in Adelaide on 15 May 1995. She was buried with her husband James Cant in a plot at the Uniting Cemetery in the historic town of Willunga that they had chosen in 1960.

== Awards ==
- John Creswell Scholarship, South Australian School of Arts and Craft, 1935
- RSASA Melrose Portrait Prize in 1940 for a self-portrait
- John Christie Wright Prize, awarded three times early in her career
- RSASA Melrose Portrait Prize in 1961
- Royal South Australian Portrait Prize, 1941
