= Charles J. Pavia =

Australian artist and art teacher

Charles John Pavia (born 17 October 1880) was an artist and art teacher in South Australia.

== History ==
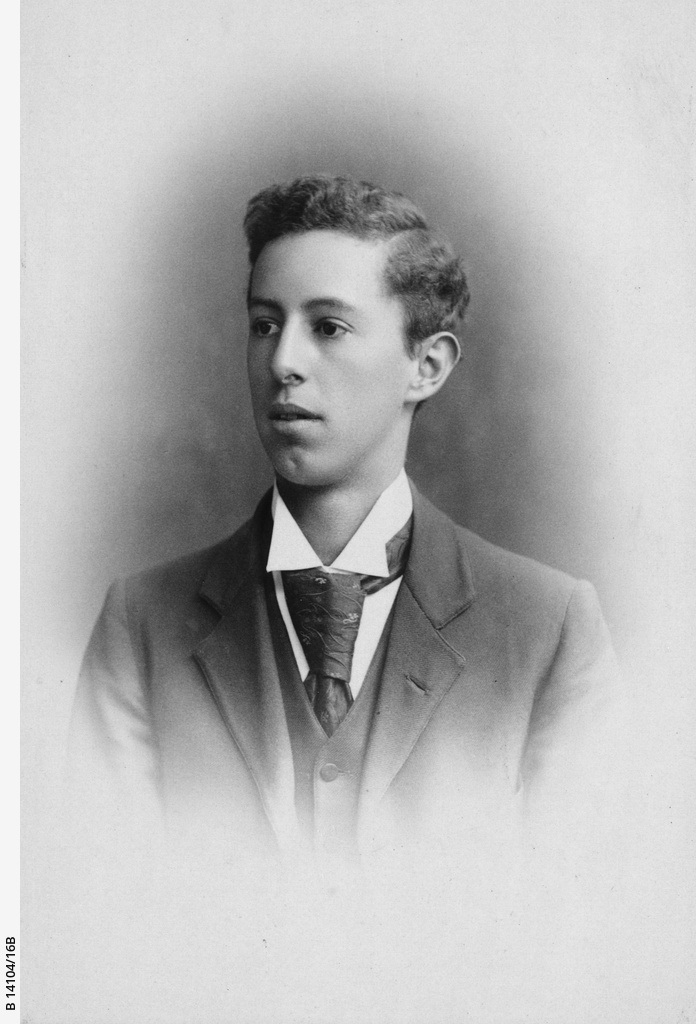
Charles John Pavia in 1898

Charles was born in Port Pirie the elder son of Victor John Pavia (c.1857–1934) and his wife Annie, née Burgess (c.1858–1932) on 11 November 1879. V. J. Pavia was president, Headmasters' Association 1906–1908.

He was educated at Thomas Caterer's Semaphore Collegiate School. He conducted drawing classes at the Port Adelaide branch of the School of Design in 1902–1910 and for a time acted as drawing master at St. Peter's College. He was assistant master of the South Australian School of Arts and Crafts from around 1910 and for three years around the end of World War I was acting Principal, but was passed over for the substantive position, which went to L. H. Howie when he returned from active service in 1920. He retired from the Department in January 1948.

He was a keen cricketer and member of the Royal Yacht Squadron, serving as its auditor. He was a longtime member of the South Australian Society of Arts, and its treasurer 1920–1934.

== Family ==
Charles John Pavia (17 October 1880 – ) married Lillie Clements Pank (ca.1880 – 22 March 1926) on 30 March 1907. Her father was a fine pianist and her uncle was Harold Pank of Laubman and Pank, opticians. Their children were:

- Victor Charles Pavia (22 January 1908 – ) married Constance Neilson Smith ( – ) on 12 June 1937
- Kathleen (12 June 1910 – )
- Dorothy (9 November 1912 – )
