= James V. Wigley =

Australian painter

James Vandeleur Wigley (1917–1999) is an Australian painter known for his sensitive depictions of aboriginal camp scenes and desert landscapes.

Wigley studied at the School of Fine Arts in North Adelaide with F. Millward Grey. During 1939 he spent time with his old school friend, the anthropologist, Ronald Berndt, at Murray Bridge, where he completed a series of portrait drawings of local people. He moved to Melbourne in 1941 where he joined an army survey regiment, then a unit making relief maps and model aeroplanes used to train officers. Wigley exhibited in the 1942 Anti-Fascist exhibition held in Melbourne where he became friends with Noel Counihan and other social realist painters and writers. After his discharge from the army in 1943 he travelled to the Northern Territory to join Ronald Berndt at Daly River. During this time he completed a number of drawings of outback camp life.

Following his return to Melbourne and two years of art study at the National Gallery School in an army rehabilitation course, Wigley travelled to Europe with fellow artist Yosl Bergner. He exhibited in Paris, at the Galerie Gentil Hommiere, and in London, before returning to Melbourne in 1953.

In 1956 Wigley went to Port Hedland in the North West to work with Donald McLeod and the Aborigines of the region in an Aboriginal workers' co-operative, living independently by mining and pearl shell gathering. During 1974 the group purchased a sheep station in the Pilbara and established an independent school. In developing this school, Wigley worked the offset press to print all material needed for a multi-lingual school, and illustrated and designed the readers' books.

In 1979 Wigley returned to Melbourne to paint and draw. In 1991 he returned to the Northern Territory for a short period, where his son, Julian, was working with Aboriginal communities. A survey of his work was held at the Niagara Galleries in 1992. He continued to paint until his death in 1999.

== Selected bibliography ==
- Encyclopedia of Australian Art. McCulloch Allan. 1984 Revised 1994.
- Artists in Australia. Germaine. M 1985.
- Rebels and Precursors. Haese, Richard. Publisher, Penguin, 1981.
- Catalogue " Art and Social Commitment: An End to the City of Dreams" 1931–1948", Art Gallery of New South Wales, Sydney, 1984
- Catalogue "Aspects of Australian Figurative Painting 1942–1962: Dreams, Fears and Desires", S.H. Ervin Gallery, Sydney, 1984
- Catalogue " James Wigley: Survey 1936–1992", Niagara Galleries, Melbourne,1992

== Collections ==
- National Gallery of Australia, ACT
- National Gallery of Victoria
- Art Gallery of Western Australia
- Bendigo Art Gallery
- Castlemaine Art Museum
- Newcastle Art Gallery
- McClelland Gallery, Melbourne
- Artbank, New South Wales
