= Rex Wood =

South Australian artist (1906–1970)

- Born: Thomas Percy Reginald Wood; 6 April 1906; Laura, South Australia, Australia
- Died: 1970; Lisbon, Portugal

Rex Wood (6 April 1906 – 1970) was a South Australian pre and post-war artist who lived for many years in Portugal.

== Biography ==
=== Early life ===
He was born Thomas Percy Reginald Wood in Laura, South Australia, the eldest of four boys born to Rev. Tom Percy Wood, who was the rector at St. John’s Church of England Church in Laura, and Fannie née Newbury. He was brother to Jack Newbury Wood, Dean Charlton Wood and Noel Herbert Wood who was also an artist. Their grandfather Thomas Percy Wood, also an Anglican minister in South Australia, was an accomplished watercolorist.

=== Education ===
Wood grew up at Laura and then Currency Creek where his father became the minister at the English Church at Finniss. He later attended St Peter’s College. He studied painting at the South Australian School of Art under Mary Packer Harris (1891–1978), and was soon recognised as a realist in a variety of mediums. In 1932 he won a prize for a holiday poster and in 1934 he won equal first prize in the Elizabeth Armstrong Memorial for Still Life Painting at the South Australian School of Arts and Crafts

=== Career ===
Rex Wood was an Associate member of the South Australian Society of Arts (SASA later the Royal South Australian Society of Arts) from 1932 until 1939. He exhibited in group exhibitions from the SASA Spring exhibition of 1932 until 1937 with two solo exhibitions in 1935 and 1937. Before his departure for England Rex Wood’s final solo exhibition of paintings and lino-cut prints at the RSASA Gallery was opened by Lady Bonython in November 1937 and the exhibition was favourably reviewed by The Advertiser’s art critic H.E. Fuller. Wood was represented in a number of exhibitions alongside fellow artists including Ivor Hele and Hans Heysen

Wood worked as an art critic for the News newspaper from about March 1934 until 1937. He reviewed, for example, Kathleen Sauerbier’s first solo exhibition at the SASA Gallery in June 1934 for the News. Then in January 1938 he departed for England and the Continent. He studied at the Anglo-French Art Centre at St John's Wood and the Southampton Row School of Art. He spent much of the war years in Portugal, maintaining some contact with Australia, sending the occasional column to The News, and purchasing some works for the Art Gallery of South Australia. He visited Australia in the mid-1950s, and then returned to Portugal, where he died in Lisbon in 1970.

== Works ==
- Art Gallery of New South Wales
- The Hamilton Gallery of Hamilton, Victoria has a portrait Vera Van Ry by Rex Wood
- The State Library of South Australia has a photograph and oil painting (1964) of Josephine Piazza "Madame Josephine", both by Rex Wood.
- National Gallery of Australia, Canberra.
