= Ann Grocott =

Australian writer, artist (born 1938)

- Born: Ann Oenone Wood; 1938 (age 87–88); Glenelg, South Australia
- Known for: Painting, writing

External videos
- "Ann Grocott - New Generation, Ancient Land, Bundaberg Regional Galleries, 2014
- "Colour II: Merv Moriarty, in the Field & Out of the Allamanda", Flying Arts Inc.

Ann Oenone Grocott (born 1938) is an Australian writer and painter, whose two children's books have been translated into Swedish and Danish. In addition to figurative, portraiture and landscape painting, her artworks include: assemblages in fabric, cement, wood, found objects etc.; oils on canvas, paper and plaster; watercolours and small sculptures. In 1999, Grocott was one of five artists chosen to represent Australia in "Our World in the Year 2000", the Winsor and Newton Worldwide Millennium Exhibition, as a result of which her work appeared in London, Stockholm, Brussels and New York.

== Early life ==
Ann Wood was born in 1938 in Glenelg, South Australia. Her father was the Australian painter, Noel Herbert Wood and her uncle, Rex Wood was an Australian painter/printmaker. Her father married Eleanor Weld Skipper whom he met at Art School in Adelaide. During World War II, Ann, her mother and her older sister Gini were evacuated from Bedarra Island to Woodend, Victoria. Following the war, her parents remained apart. Ann Wood eventually married Terry Grocott and reconnected with her father.

== Author ==
In her 40s, Grocott published two novels for children aged 8–12 years: Duck For Danger (1985) and Danni's Desperate Journey (1987, Angus & Robertson). Duck For Danger, whose protagonist traveled from Queensland to Bangkok and London, was described as combining "a liberal helping of humour with a sense of the daring and unexpected into a totally irresistible blending". The protagonist of Danni's Desperate Journey, a science fiction fantasy, travels the universe. Duck For Danger was translated into Swedish as Fly för livet, Micky (Wahlstroms, 1987, ISBN 91-32-12837-1) and Danni's Desperate Journey was translated into Danish as Fridas farlige faerd (Tellerup, 1989, ISBN 87-588-0358-0). Grocott also published a handbook on How to write for children (1985, AWPS), as well as several short stories. A French criticism of juvenile writing quoted her on the challenges of writing for younger people.

== Artist ==
Grocott eventually decided to concentrate on painting. She worked for a decade as a self-taught artist, and was a student of the Australian Flying Arts School. The school was led by Mervyn Moriarty, who flew to remote areas of regional Queensland and north-western New South Wales to give workshops. Grocott earned a Post-Graduate Diploma in Fine Art from Monash University in 1991.

In 1999, Grocott was one of five artists chosen to represent Australia in "Our World in the Year 2000", the Winsor and Newton Worldwide Millennium Exhibition. Her painting New Generation -- Ancient Land (1998) was shown in London, Stockholm and Brussels. The London showing was opened by Prince Charles. As part of the United Nations Millennium Art Exhibition it was also shown in New York. The piece was purchased for the permanent collection of the Bundaberg Regional Galleries.

Her works have been included in Sydney, Australia's Salon des Refuses, an alternative to the prestigious exhibitions held annually for the Archibald and Wynne Prizes. In 2011, she won both the grand prize and the portrait award in the Bundaberg Sugar Gala Arts Festival. Grocott has exhibited in both solo and group exhibitions and her works are held in gallery collections. Her work appears in the 20th Century Fox movie Nim's Island, based on the book by Wendy Orr.

Grocott exhibited at the Allamanda Gallery which was an important center for artists and their exchange of ideas in Bundaberg. In August 2019, Ann Grocott was showcased with Jennifer McDuff, Marvene Ash, John Honeywill, and Coralie Busby in the exhibition Out of The Allamanda at Bundaberg Regional Art Gallery. The exhibition was developed in collaboration with the Colour and Response tour and exhibition which examined the impact of the work of Merv Moriarty and Flying Arts throughout Queensland.

In 2017 Ann Grocott curated Bloodline at the Bundaberg Regional Art Gallery. The exhibition featured works by Ann Grocott, Noel Wood 1912-2001 (her father), Rex Wood 1906-1970 (her uncle) and Thomas Wood 1855-1937 (her great-grandfather).

In 2019, just before an art auction at Leonard Joel in Melbourne, Ann Grocott discovered several works by her father Noel Wood were fakes or copies with a forged signature of her father's. The works were subsequently withdrawn from the auction sale.
