= Jessamine Buxton =

South Australian artist and sculptor

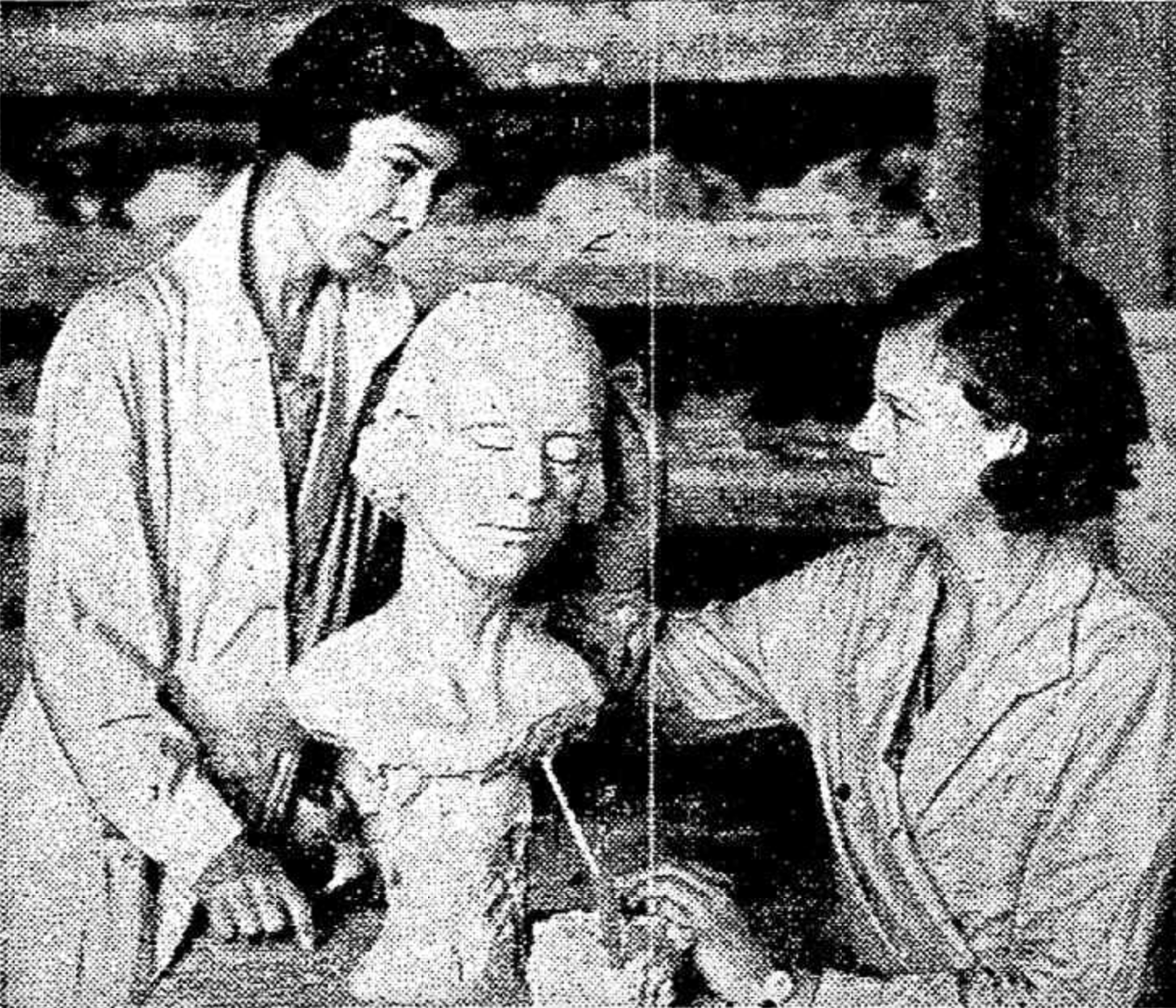
Jessamine Buxton (left) and her sculpture student Jean Shephard, c.1933

Jessamine Victoria Alexandrine Buxton (1895–1966) was a South Australian artist and sculptor.

== Career ==
Buxton was educated at Adelaide High School and won a scholarship to study at the South Australian Royal Society of Arts. She later won a travelling scholarship but was not permitted to take it up by her father. She stayed in South Australia all her life and painted and exhibited regularly in Adelaide.

In 1915, Buxton designed a patriotic Christmas card for soldiers, wishing them luck at the Front and a safe return home.

After years of study, Buxton began to teach at the South Australian School of Arts and Crafts. She had a major impact as an art educator and influenced South Australian sculptor and artist John Stuart Dowie. Dowie was also taught by Marie Tuck, another influential South Australian women artist and teacher of the same era.

== Awards ==
Offered the Society of Arts prize, a travelling scholarship.

1936 First Prize in the Autumn Exhibition for Still Life No 11 Zinnias.

Society of Arts prize for modelling.

== Media ==
Buxton used included pastels, watercolours, sculpture, silverpoint drawing, miniature painting, china painting and needlework. During the war, Dr Henry Newland assigned Buxton the task of sketching human organs after they were removed. There was such a shortage of photographers then.
