= Mervyn Ashmore Smith =

Australian artist (1904–1994)

Mervyn Ashmore Smith OAM (11 December 1904 – 18 March 1994) was an Australian artist. He was best known for his watercolour landscapes and botanical works.

He was born in Sydney, trained as an architect and was for a time town planner for Newcastle, but spent his later years in Adelaide. He was married to the notable watercolour artist and art teacher Ruth Tuck (22 July 1914 – 10 October 2008), whose father was Marie Tuck's cousin. From 1949 to 1953 they lived in Newcastle, where he was employed as planning officer with the Northumberland County Council. Then returned to Adelaide, where they frequently held joint exhibitions of their work. They had three children, a son and twin daughters.

Mervyn Smith's paintings "Sydney Heads from Vaucluse", "Dockyards", "Sydney Opera House under construction", and "Sydney Opera House" are held by the Art Gallery of South Australia.
