= Clara Winifred Howie =

Australian nurse and administrator (1881–1960)

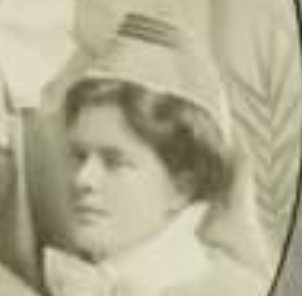
- Born: 27 June 1881; Glenelg
- Died: 13 August 1960 (aged 79); Forestville
- Occupation: nurse
- Employer: District Trained Nursing Society
- Successor: Florence Neild

Clara Winifred Howie MBE (27 June 1881 – 13 August 1960) was an Australian nurse and administrator. Also known as Winifred Howie, in 1937 she was the acting President of the Australasian Trained Nurses' Association before leading the South Australian branch until 1941.

== Life ==
Howie was born in 1881 in Adelaide's seaside suburb of Glenelg. Her eldest brother was the artist L. H. Howie. Her parents were Clara Jane (born Hotham) and her husband George Cullen Howie who had emigrated from Scotland. Her father died in 1883 and his mother took the children to stay with her father, the Rev. John Hotham, in Port Elliot, where she ran a small private school in the winter and in the summer they took in boarders.

After training she began working for the District Trained Nursing Society (DTNS) in 1911 and they sent her as the first nurse to attend people living at Hergott Springs in the following year. She was over 350 miles from Adelaide and he closest doctor was 150 miles away. She lived at the pub, and learned to ride a camel as her patients were Indian and Afghan cameleers.

In 1919 she opened a new branch of the District Trained Nursing Society at Goolwa. In 1919 she was the assistant superintendent of nurses for the DTNS in Adelaide. She became the superintendent in 1926, sending her nurses into the bush to care for Aboriginal families if they could or would not attend the nursing stations.

She was a member of the Australasian Trained Nurses' Association from 1924 and in 1937 she was briefly the acting president. The DTNS became the "District and Bush Nursing Society of S.A. Inc" in 1937 and she led the South Australian branch of the ATNA from 1937 to 1941. In 1948 she became a Member of The Most Excellent Order of the British Empire (MBE) and retired due to poor health in 1949.

Howie died in 1960 at her house in the Adelaide suburb of Forestville. She was cremated.
