= Kathleen Sauerbier =

Australian artist

Kathleen Margaret Sauerbier (21 January 1903 – 11 March 1991) was a South Australian pre and post-war Modernist artist who painted landscapes, portraits and still-life, mainly in oils. Her artworks are held in the National Gallery of Australia in Canberra, the Art Gallery of South Australia and at the University of Western Australia as well as numerous private collections.

== Biography ==
=== Early life ===
Kathleen Margaret Sauerbier was born in the Adelaide suburb of Brighton on 21 January 1903 to John James Sauerbier (1858–1938) and Mary Anne Louisa [née Locke] (1881–1964). Her parents had married on 27 Feb 1902 at the residence of Mr J. J. Pike in Brighton. She was the eldest of four children (John Tapley, Louis Christian and Gladys Mary) and they were third generation German settlers. Her paternal grandfather, Christian Johann Sauerbier (1814–1893) had come to South Australia in 1840 and by the 1850s he had settled in Happy Valley, where he acquired over 800 acres of land. He had married Margaret [née Tapley] (1825–1901) in 1855 at Trinity Church, Adelaide and they had three sons (John Christian, John James and George) and a daughter (Mary Elizabeth).

=== Education ===
Sauerbier was educated at St Peters Girls School in Adelaide. She loved the arts and was a keen writer. She loved to paint, read, listen to music and was a nature lover. She met her best friend Audrey Sayers at the school and they shared a love of art studying under the drawing teacher Miss E. M. Barnes.

When she finished school, Sauerbier attended the recently opened School for Fine Arts in Tynte Street, North Adelaide (1923–25) studying under the principal Frederick Christian Britton. The School of Fine Arts had been established by Edith Napier Birks and had opened in August 1921. One of her fellow students was Horace Trennery and one of her tutors there was Frederick Millward Grey. It is believed that Grey influenced her to study at the Central School of Arts and Crafts in London where he himself had studied. One of her early pencil drawings was included in an exhibition at the Farmers Art Gallery in Sydney from 17 to 24 November 1924 held under the auspices of the Society of Artists.

Sauerbier went to London aboard R.M.S Maloja in March 1925 with her parents and her best friend Audrey Sayers, daughter of the late Mr. Bert Sayers. The girls studied at the Central School of Arts and Crafts for two years, studying with Bernard Meninsky and Duncan Grant and their fellow students included Australians Audrey Hardy, Jimmie Lynton and Hal Missingham. Sauerbier was heavily influenced by Modern Art during this time, travelling to Europe and immersing herself in art galleries and museums.

=== Return to South Australia and early exhibitions ===
Sauerbier returned to South Australia in January 1928. She was suffering from exhaustion from her travels, so she moved in with her parents in Malvern, SA. She did not paint a lot during this time but she did return to study with Frederick Millward Grey. She had also visited Port Willunga by 1930 and subsequently fell in love with it.

She longed to be back in Europe as her style of “Modernist” painting was not received well in Adelaide. She perceived Adelaide as very “Provincial” and felt that her contemporaries such as Hans Heysen and Lionel Lindsay were “old school”. She persevered though and exhibited some of her works in 1930, 1931 and 1934 at the South Australian Society of Arts (SASA) in Kintore Street. She held her first solo exhibition in 1934 that received some mixed reviews, some positive and others hostile. The Society was so impressed by her work that they elected her to join as a fellow of the RSASA (the Society was awarded a Royal warrant in 1935). She now also exhibited her work in Melbourne as part of the “Group 12” and seemingly fell in love with Melbourne's cosmopolitan vibe.

=== Port Willunga ===
Meanwhile, in 1932, she had moved to Port Willunga full-time into a 2-storey building that was then known as “The Residential Café”, formerly the Seaview Hotel. The building was owned by Charles Francis Muller, a building contractor from Adelaide. The bank repossessed the property from Muller in 1938 and it was sold to Geoffrey Horton Ring. Sauerbier, and her husband, purchased the property from Geoffrey Ring in 1940 and used it as her holiday house, which she visited several times a year to paint her favourite landscapes and beach scenes. She could be seen sitting out in any weather, with her easel weighted down with rocks just to paint a particular scene in real time (en-plein air).

Her close artist friend Horace Trenerry had also moved to Port Willunga in 1934 and it is said that he lived a bohemian lifestyle there, often squatting in empty houses in the district. They painted together and Sauerbier had influence on Trenerry's work. She introduced him to a freer more expressive style of painting and his palette took on the muted colours that Sauerbier favoured. She also made friends with her neighbour John Dowie whose family had the holiday cottage next door, and who was introduced to her by Ivor Hele, another artist who also resided in the area.

=== Move to Melbourne ===
Sauerbier loved to travel and she travelled to Singapore, Java and Bali in 1937. She had met her future husband John Baldwyn Bryce (1906–1980), an industrial chemist, in Melbourne in 1935. They married on 23 Dec 1937, when she was aged 34 years, and they lived in South Yarra and later Donvale. They had no children.

In Melbourne, Sauerbier became a member of The Contemporary Arts Society (CAS) and started designing fabric, textiles and jewellery. Tragically, in 1947, Sauerbier was seriously burnt at her Port Willunga property when a kerosene fridge exploded in front of her. She was admitted to the Royal Adelaide Hospital for nine months to recover from serious burns. Sauerbier sold the Port Willunga property in 1952 to her close friends, Edward Hayward and his wife Ursula of Carrick Hill. The Haywards were huge art collectors and they restored the building using it as their holiday home. Sauerbier continued to visit Port Willunga but would stay at the Christies Beach Hotel. She continued painting up until the death of her husband in 1980.

=== Later exhibitions and death ===
Sauerbier had a one-person retrospective in Adelaide in 1984 at the Beehive Corner Gallery where she had 27 works of art, most of which were for sale. The exhibition was organised by David Dridan and opened by John Dowie. She was living in Donvale, Victoria at the time.

Her last exhibition was 2 years later in Aldinga in 1986. She died, aged 88 years, on 11 March 1991 and she was buried in Donvale with her husband.

One of her works was featured in an exhibition at the Art Gallery of South Australia called Modern Australian Women: paintings and prints 1925-1945 curated by Jane Hylton. In November 1998 there was an exhibition titled A Fleurieu Heritage of Horace Trenerry and Kathleen Sauerbier's work at Chapel Hill Winery, McLaren Vale, curated by Betty Snowden, as part of the Fleurieu Biennale Heritage Exhibition. The Painted Coast exhibition at the Art Gallery of South Australia in 1998 was curated by Jane Hylton and a catalogue was produced.

From 9 March to 26 June 2011, there was a major retrospective exhibition of 40 artworks at Carrick Hill called Kathleen Sauerbier: A Modern Pursuit. The exhibition, that included examples of her textile and fabric designs, was curated by Gloria Strzelecki who also published a book based on the exhibition. One of Sauerbier's works (Ochre Cliffs) featured in the Look. Look again exhibition at the Lawrence Wilson Art gallery of the University of Western Australia in Oct-Dec 2012.

== Works ==
Kathleen Sauerbier's artworks are part of the permanent collections of the following institutions:

- National Gallery of Australia, Canberra.
- Art Gallery of South Australia.
- University of Western Australia.
