= Hugh Gemmell Lamb-Smith =

Australian educator

Gemmell Lamb-Smith
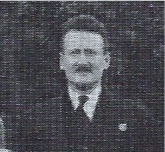
- H.G. Lamb-Smith at C.G.S. (1930)
- Born: 31 March 1889; Cheltenham, Victoria
- Died: 26 December 1951 (aged 62); East St Kilda, Victoria
- Education: Scotch College, Melbourne; University of Melbourne
- Occupations: Teacher; Wangaratta Grammar School; Tudor House School, Mona Vale; Chatswood Preparatory School; State Teaching Service, Victoria: Teacher, Housemaster, and Chief of Staff; Caulfield Grammar School
- Spouse: Dorothy Vernon Lamb-Smith (née Harris)
- Parent: William Lamb-Smith (1846–1910) Margaret Serpine Gemmell (1853–1938)

Signature
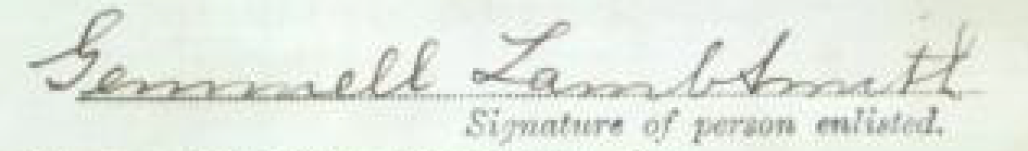

Hugh Gemmell Lamb-Smith (31 March 1889 – 26 December 1951), known as Gemmell, was an innovative Australian educator who landed at Anzac Cove, Gallipoli, on Sunday, 25 April 1915 as a member of the Second Field Ambulance unit, and went on to serve in Europe for the duration of the war. He also served (immediately post-war) as an AIF Education Scheme Instructor in Belgium. He was a prominent (lay) member of the Melbourne Anglican community, and he taught at Caulfield Grammar School from 1913 to 1951.

"He was a man of wide and sympathetic culture. In addition to his love for music, he was a discriminating connoisseur of painting, and a devotee of ballet and the theatre. He was a devoted churchman and interested in manly sports. Above all, he was an idealist, but, unlike many idealists, he was ready to give practical expression to his ideals." — Webber (1981), p.248

Teeth-Testing Rations.

Our meals are not like those on board the transport; we are not on
active service, so get just the 1lb. of meat, ½lb. of bread, and ½lb.
biscuits (heavens, no wonder they are strict about teeth), and sundry
things, like salt, vegetables tea, &c.
We also carry two days' rations in little bags, which we sling on
our overcrowded persons; they are very cute affairs, and contain
tinned meat, biscuits, tin of soup powders, tea, and sugar.
To give you an idea of what army ambulance corps have to carry
I will make a list:– Belt, in which is first aid pouch and mess tin, own
waterbottle, own haversack in which are housewife, towel, and little
things; iron rations, overcoat rolled to contain Balaclava, muffler,
spare socks, waterproof, blanket, and change of garments in a roll;
patients' waterbottle, and haversack of medical comfort.
Still, we can do it, so the training does something, you see. …
It is marvelous how the wounded stand being dragged by us over
all kinds of ghastly places.
The first day I think I bandaged everything from a shot-off finger
to a broken back.
We have all got little humpies dug out of the hill for safety, and at
present it is more like a foreshore camp of the "Gayboys" than a war.
The weather is superb, not a cloud, but the nights are quite cold.
(Gemmell Lamb-Smith, 2nd Field Ambulance, Gallipoli, 1915)

External images
- A "housewife" (Australian War Memorial Collection).
- A "housewife" (Australian War Memorial Collection).
- A "housewife" (Australian War Memorial Collection).
- A "housewife" (Australian War Memorial Collection).

== Family ==
The son of William and Margaret Serpine "Maggie" Lamb-Smith, née Gemmell, Hugh Gemmell Lamb-Smith was born on 31 March 1889, at Cheltenham, Victoria. and died on 26 December 1951, at his home in East St Kilda, Victoria.

=== Father and mother ===
His father, William Lamb-Smith (1846–1910), born in Renfrewshire, Scotland in 1846, was a Justice of the Peace, and a prominent auctioneer and land developer in the outskirts of Melbourne. He was also, among many things: a Councillor of the Moorabbin Shire Council from 1899 until 1902 (when, due to his move from Beaumaris to Armadale, he was no longer residentially qualified to serve), and served as its President in 1893; President of the Cheltenham Lawn Tennis Club; President of the Mentone Erica Literary, Musical and Dramatic Society, the Captain of the Cheltenham Rifle Club from its inception until his death (in Armadale, Victoria on 23 May 1910); and the Consul-General for Paraguay.

His mother, Margaret Serpine "Maggie" Lamb-Smith (1853–1938), née Gemmell — who had married William in St Kilda, Victoria on 19 April 1883 — was the daughter of Hugh Mitchell Campbell Gemmell (1827–1880), and Simonette Marie Gemmell, née Christiani (1824–1888). Born in the West Indies, she "was much given to good works, and rated serving people more highly than reputation or wealth", and, moreover, "was sensitive to the beauties represented by art, and especially music". She was a life governor of the Alfred Hospital, and a member of the foundation committee of the Convalescent Home for Men, at Cheltenham (which operated from 1886 to 1956). She died at St Kilda on 22 June 1938.

=== Sister ===
Gemmell's only sibling, Mora Marie Lamb-Smith (1884–1945), was a trained nurse. She enlisted in World War I, and served in India, with the rank of Sister, in the Australian Army Nursing Service. She returned to Australian on 17 May 1919, and her military appointment was terminated on 29 June 1919. She married Hugh Gibson Gemmell Sloane (1875–1960), of Mulwala, New South Wales on 26 October 1921 at Christ Church in South Yarra; they had two sons, one of whom died at the age of seven. Mora and her brother Gemmell were both confirmed at the same ceremony at Saint George's Anglican Church in Malvern, Victoria on 21 June 1904.

=== Wife ===
One of the five daughters and four sons of William Marshall Harris, (1842–1905), bank manager, and Alderman of the Borough of Armidale, and Marina Jane Harris (1851–1914), née Ross, Dorothy Vernon Harris (1885–1964) was born in Armidale on 3 September 1885. One of her brothers, Second Lieutenant Philip Vernon Harris, A.I.F. (1880–1917), died of wounds on 11 June 1917, in France.

Dorothy graduated from the Sydney Kindergarten Training College as a fully qualified kindergarten teacher in December 1908. She married Gemmell Lamb-Smith at Turramurra (a suburb of Sydney), on 17 May 1924. They had no children. Dorothy died in Sydney on 15 August 1964.

From his own, direct, personal experience of Dorothy, Horace Webber (1981, p. 248), observed that she was a "gracious lady", and remarked that she was well aware of the sufferings Gemmell experienced as an ever-present consequence of the horrors of his wartime experiences, and that, once they were married, "her benign influence did much to restore his peace of mind" — and there's no doubt that Dorothy's innate, natural propensities in these directions had been considerably enhanced by her own extensive wartime experiences of working for the Red Cross, as a quartermaster, in Australian military hospitals in England from 1916 to 1919.

She was one of the 2,300 Victorians that were awarded a Queen Elizabeth II Coronation Medal in June 1953.

== Education ==
He was educated at Scotch College, Melbourne from 1901 to 1904, at various other schools, and, then, at Wangaratta Grammar School (in 1907), where he not only completed his Junior Public Examination studies, but was also (concurrently) employed as a teacher. In 1910, he enrolled as an "evening student" in a Bachelor of Arts degree at the University of Melbourne).

In addition to the extra-curricular studies he had pursued in England under the auspices of the AIF Education Scheme prior to his return to Australia in November 1919, he resumed his "evening student" university studies in 1921, having settled into his teaching role at Caulfield Grammar School once again. He eventually graduated with a Bachelor of Arts in 1931, and a Diploma in Commerce in 1933.

== Teaching (1907–1914) ==
Having taught at Wangaratta Grammar School in 1907, he went on to teach at another two schools in New South Wales — Tudor House School, Mona Vale and Chatswood Preparatory School — before returning to Melbourne in 1910, and entering the Victorian State Government Education Department's Teaching Service. He commenced teaching at Caulfield Grammar School in 1913, having been recruited by its owner and principal, Walter Murray Buntine (1866–1953), "from a small school in Gippsland", to serve as a "Resident Master".

== First A.I.F. ==
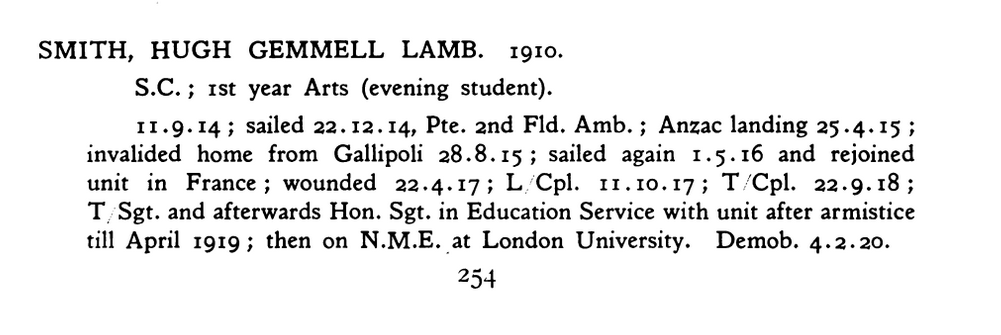
Entry in Melbourne University's Roll of the Returned (1926), p.254

On 11 September 1914, soon after the declaration of war (4 August 1914), Lamb-Smith — "[whose] sympathy lay with healing people rather than wounding them" (Webber, 1981, p. 248) — enlisted in the A.I.F., and joined the Expeditionary Camp at Broadmeadows.

On 15 December 1914, having completed his basic training, he was appointed to the Second Field Ambulance, a unit that had been raised at Broadmeadows, in mid-August 1914. During the five years that he served in the A.I.F., Private Lamb-Smith was temporarily promoted on a number of occasions to fill vacancies caused by the vacations, leave, or deployment of others — including temporary lance corporal, temporary corporal, and temporary sergeant – then, once the individual he had replaced had returned, he reverted to his earlier rank.

=== Landing at Anzac Cove on 25 April 1915 ===
As a member of the Second Field Ambulance, he landed at Anzac Cove on 25 April 1915. The historians at the Australian War Memorial write of a "casualties debacle":

During the day the medical services were overwhelmed. The suffering of the wounded was pitiful; many men died on the beach, and it is estimated that hundreds more lay in the hills out of the reach of help. Most notably, there were inadequate arrangements for the critically wounded, who could not be taken back to the ships until after all the troops and stores had been landed. It was early evening before boats became available; many of the maimed and bleeding were sent off in filthy barges.
No one knows for sure how many Australians died on the first day, perhaps 650. Total casualties, including wounded, must have been about 2,000.

=== Illness and injury ===
Lamb-Smith sought treatment for gastric illness from time to time at Gallipoli, and in November 1915 he was hospitalized in Egypt with a case of "Enteric Fever" (i.e., Typhoid fever), which was severe enough for him to be invalided back to Australia in December 1915, where he recovered sufficiently, four months later, to be able to return to duty. He rejoined the Second Field Ambulance, in France, in August 1916.

He was wounded-in-action in the left leg, in France, on 22 April 1917. He was hospitalized for a month, released, and, then, re-admitted with a poisoned left leg five months later. He returned to active duty with the Second Field Ambulance in mid-December 1917, and continued to serve with them until the end of the war.

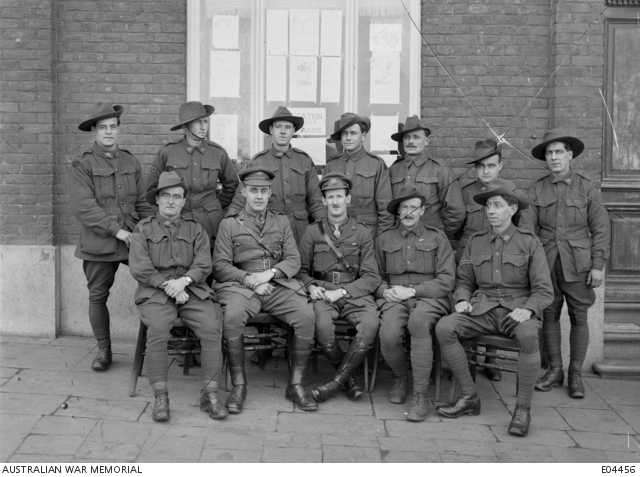
Group of A.I.F. Educational Instructors, First Australian Field Ambulance, in Belgium, 1919. Lamb-Smith is second from right, front row.

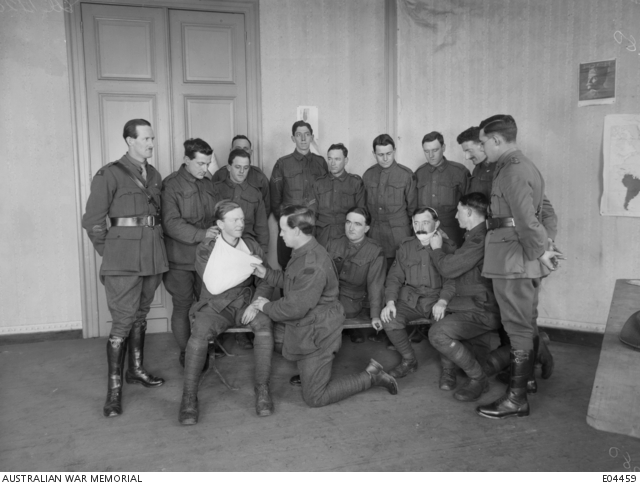
Soldiers receiving first-aid instruction as part of the AIF Education scheme, in Belgium, 1919. Lamb-Smith, one of the instructors, is second from right, standing.

== The A.I.F. Educational Scheme ==
The A.I.F. Education Scheme was created and administered by Brigadier-General George Merrick Long (1874–1930) — a former headmaster of Trinity Grammar School, in Victoria (1904–1911); and, at the time of his appointment as Director of Education, A.I.F., the Anglican Bishop of Bathurst — with the assistance, support, and guidance of Major Harry Thomson (1888–1933), a Rhodes Scholar, of Oxford and Adelaide Universities, and Captain William James Mulholland (1888–1966), of Sydney University. The Scheme had its origins in the A.I.F.’s response to the report made by Long in mid-1918: at a time when it was obvious that it could take at least twelve months for the available transport to be able to repatriate all military personnel to Australia.

Following his report, Long was commissioned to form the A.I.F.’s Education Service — which operated continuously from that time until late 1920 (at which time all of the overseas military personnel had been repatriated). Given that very few of its members were professional soldiers, and that all of its members were volunteers, the A.I.F. clearly understood its obligation to "refit the fighting man for his return to civil life and to make good as far as possible the wastage of the years spent at war" (Long, 1920, p. 141); and, in recognizing that "the longer the war goes on the more difficult becomes the [men's] taking up of the old life", its Education Scheme was specifically designed to meet the particular post-war needs of three quite different groups of men:

(a) those whose yet-to-be-completed occupational training had been abandoned upon their enlistment;
(b) those who had enlisted at an early age and, as a consequence, had not yet begun to learn a trade or occupation — as well as those who, for other reasons (e.g., lack of opportunity), had not received any occupational training at all prior to their enlistment; and
(c) those who, as a consequence of their A.I.F. experience, or as a consequence of technological developments, realized that they could not go back to their former occupation.

When applying for support from the scheme, the men provided particulars of their pre-enlistment occupation, their current military employment, their intended post-war occupation, the areas within which they desired training, and the details of any special courses of instruction that might prove beneficial. Training was freely available to all, always voluntary, and never compulsory. It was of a non-military nature, and was delivered to the men, as part of their individual post-war demobilization procedure, through two separate but inter-dependent programmes:

(a) "Internal": through in-service training, relying on the resources available within the A.I.F., conducted whist the individual remained within the army (and, moreover, this in-service training was also continued on the transport ships back to Australia, and only ceased on their disembarkation);
(b) "External": where the soldier, although on full-pay, was released from all military duty, and attended a university, college, school, workshop, farm, etc. in order to acquire specific skills or to undergo specific formal training.

Further, in relation to "undergraduate studies", the (greatly-overcrowded-with-individuals-returned-from service) British Universities were quite unable to service the needs of those still-overseas Australians desiring to resume/commence undergraduate studies. Recognizing this, General Sir John Monash, Commander of the Australian Forces, "granted early repatriation [to Australia] to undergraduates so that they might rejoin their Universities in March, 1919 … [in order] to save the wastage of still another year from [their] professional career" (Long, 1920, p145).

Lamb-Smith not only worked immediately post-war as one of the scheme's in-service instructors — remaining overseas such that he was in one of the last groups repatriated — but he also used the opportunity the scheme provided for him, as a career educator, to spend some time at King's College London where, he studied (among other things) the approach of Henry Caldwell Cook, a British ex-soldier and teacher at an all-boys school, whose work emphasized the importance of making learning an exciting, inspirational, and imaginative exercise for all involved. Following that sojourn in England, Lamb-Smith also studied in France, before returning to his instructional duties in Belgium, from whence he was repatriated on 6 October 1919.

== Teaching at Caulfield Grammar School (1920–1951) ==
Lamb-Smith returned to Australia from his overseas service on 6 November 1919, and was officially discharged from the A.I.F. on 4 February 1920. Inspired to deliver his teaching with an entirely new outlook, and in an entirely new way, he resumed his teaching career at Caulfield Grammar School in the first term of 1920, although he was in a rather fragile state and greatly affected by his horrific wartime experiences as a member of the Field Ambulance.

"He was a member of the Anzac forces at Gallipolii. He served on the Western Front, surviving all dangers throughout the war. … He carried in the bleeding remnants of dying friends and companions. He saw the bones protruding from wounded limbs, the smashed faces, the horrors of gas. … The long and terrible strain had insidious effects, and for long after the war his mind was tortured with the memory of the dreadful things he had seen. … In 1920 he returned to Caulfield, at first with a mind still tortured in itself." — (Webber, 1981, pp.248, 249)

"History [at Caulfield Grammar] was taught by Lamb Smith, whose nerves had deteriorated because of his experiences overseas during the First World War. He had something of [W.S.] Morcom's eagle-like profile, but softened by a less prominent jaw and a kindlier disposition. Fair hair sprouted from his high forehead, lines radiated from his blue eyes when he laughed. Although Smith was a kind man, when he did lose his temper all his self-control went with it."

As an (already) experienced teacher of boys and young men, Lamb-Smith had been greatly influenced by his wartime observations of the prior education, wants, needs, talents, and native abilities of the men who enrolled in the AIF Education Scheme in order to prepare themselves academically, occupationally, and personally for their return to post-war civilian life (often in an entirely new and different occupation from that which they followed at the time of their enlistment).

Having directly observed these men collectively — most of whom had completed their secondary education some years earlier — he began to recognize the importance of teaching in a far more interesting and engaging fashion. Moreover, he also came to recognize the considerable impact of the wide range of useful skills the men had (incidentally) acquired as a consequence of their military service; both in terms of unlocking their (otherwise) hidden talents, and in terms of making them far more useful to themselves and their society.

=== Hobbies ===
Lamb-Smith House.

Early in the new year members of the hobbies club at the Caulfield Grammar
School will occupy one of the most elaborate school clubhouses In Victoria.
Twelve years ago a few boys were encouraged by Mr. H. G. Lamb Smith,
a member of the school staff, to compare notes on their hobbies and to bring to-
gether examples of their work in order to interest other boys. From this
small beginning a number of groups were formed, and under the stimulus of
an annual exhibition the hobbies club became an energetic body.
With the assistance of the dramatic society it obtained much useful equip-
ment for school and leisure activities.
For the last two years the club has been working to provide a headquarters
building, and the boys, with the support of the parents' committee, have now
raised a sufficient sum to enable a large clubhouse to be built.
Work will begin on the erection of the building at once. The site is being
prepared, and the boys will carry out much of the work under the guidance of
qualified instructors. The building will be completed early next year.
Contained In the building which will be about 80ft long, will be a workshop,
a craftroom, a darkroom, and a radio-room. An area near by will be set aside
for gardening and nature study. The parents' committee will help the boys to
provide equipment.
The Argus, 12 December 1935.

One of the significant consequences of the time Lamb-Smith had spent at King's College London, and the reinvigoration and inspiration received from his studies of the "play way" approach of Henry Caldwell Cook, was his active encouragement of students' extra-curricular pursuits on his return to teaching at Caulfield Grammar.

Moreover, he "realized the benefits to both performers and observers of having good things brought to notice"; and, he also understood that, it was not just for the benefit that the pursuit of those activities brought to the individual "doers and collectors of things", but also that, "[if] the fruits of their [individual] skills [could] be shown to others [it might] encourage them, perhaps, to join in the activity", these pursuits would prove of equal value to the entire school (Webber, 1981, p. 249).

Over time, he encouraged the formation of various clubs centred on various arts, crafts, and skills; the first of these to hold an exhibition, the Radio Club, was based upon a strong student interest in such things, such as that of the future architect, Samuel Roy Lighton (1905-1980).

Other clubs, once formed, were also encouraged to exhibit their work; and it was not long before these isolated exhibitions were combined into the school's "Hobbies Day", "one of the great annual events of the school [wherein], for a time, the classrooms, the corridors, and precincts were filled with an enthusiastic throng, fathers, mothers, girlfriends, friends' friends, all admiring, and all being made aware that education extended beyond the classroom and the playground to the limitless horizon" (Webber, 1981, p. 249).

By 1935, The Age was reporting that "Caulfield Grammar is well catered for in the matter of school clubs. There is the radio club, the field naturalists' club, the hobbles club, which recently held a most successful exhibition; the dramatic society, the debating club, and the camera club".

=== Cadet Corps ===
Some form of military training had been a part of the formal tuition at Caulfield Grammar School since its founding in 1881. When it officially raised its own Cadet Corps as a detachment of the Victorian Volunteer Cadet Corps on 3 March 1885, it was the eighth school in Victoria to do so. The Cadet Unit which had been completely disbanded in 1929, was re-established, during wartime, in 1941. Lamb-Smith volunteered and was immediately made its O.I.C. He continued in that role until December 1948.

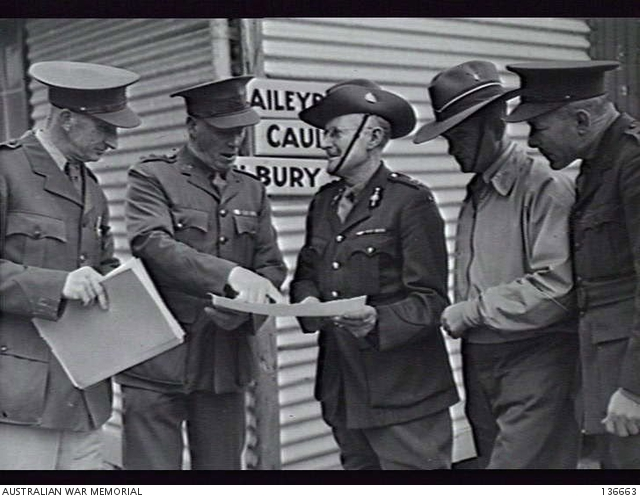
Lieutenant H.G. Lamb-Smith, O.I.C. Caulfield Grammar Cadet Unit (centre) at a combined camp for 2,000 schoolboy cadets in August 1942.

== Other offices ==
In his lifetime he variously held the offices of lay Chairman of the (St Paul's) Cathedral Branch of the Church of England Men's Society, President of the Old Caulfield Grammarians' Association, Chaplain of the Caulfield Grammarians' Masonic Lodge, the Treasurer of St James the Great Anglican Church, East St Kilda, Honorary Treasurer of the Victorian Amateur Athletic Association's Inter-Club Sports Committee, and the Caulfield Branch of the All for Australia League. He was a member of the British Association for the Advancement of Science in 1914.

Also, he was an active member of the Returned Sailors and Soldiers Imperial League of Australia (later, the Returned Sailors' Soldiers' and Airmens Imperial League of Australia), the Honorary Organizer of the Caulfield Grammar School's Memorial Hall Fund, and, with his wife Dorothy, he worked actively for the Auxiliary of the Royal Children's Hospital.

Extra Verse for the
National Anthem

God bless our splendid men,
Send them safe home again,
God bless our men.
Keep them victorious,
Patient and chivalrous;
They are so dear to us,
God bless our men.
—————————
Nesta Blennerhassett, 1915.

== Remembrance and Thanksgiving at Caulfield Grammar School ==
=== Anzac Day ===
Among all of the Australian Schools, Caulfield Grammar School has an unusual, if not unique, relationship with 25 April.

- It is Anzac Day: the day that Australia, as a nation, commemorates the sacrifices of those who served in the armed forces, and honours their contributions to the nation, on the anniversary of the landing at Anzac Cove, Gallipoli, on 25 April 1915 (at which Lamb-Smith, himself, had participated).
- It is the anniversary of the founding of Caulfield Grammar School, on 25 April 1881 – this is an extraordinary coincidence, for it is clear, from a number of different advertisements, that the school's founder, Joseph Henry Davies (1856–1890), had always intended to open the school on Wednesday, 20 April 1881; however, just at the last minute, Davies postponed the opening until Monday, 25 April.

=== Remembrance Day ===
The idea of a moment of silence at the eleventh hour of the eleventh day of the eleventh month was first suggested by an Old Caulfield Grammarian, journalist Edward George Honey (1885–1922), in letter he wrote on 8 May 1919, to The Evening News of London.

== Death ==
Having discharged "the heavy responsibilities" of reading out the "names of the Fallen" (the majority of whom Lamb-Smith had directly known in person, the remainder by reputation) at Caulfield Grammar's annual Remembrance Day Ceremony in November 1951, Lamb-Smith returned to his office, "suffered a severe stroke, and collapsed" — "he lived on for some weeks, but never recovered from the illness", and died at his home in East St Kilda on 26 December 1951 (Webber, 1981, pp. 250–251).

== Legacy ==
In a number of ways, Lamb-Smith's legacy is deeply embedded within Caulfield Grammar School:

- "The wide range of clubs and organizations, the varied extra-curricular activities now available to boys at Caulfield Grammar School is a direct result of this wonderful man." — (Weber, 1981, p. 249)
- A posthumous portrait, commissioned by the Caulfield Grammarians' Association in 1973, and painted by Noel Counihan (1913–1986), a former student of Lamb-Smith's, now stands on permanent display in the Caulfield Campus's "Cripps Centre" — the building complex which, in 2005, replaced the Memorial Hall that had been destroyed by fire on "Cup Day" 2000.
- The wooden crafts and hobbies complex built in 1936, named Lamb Smith House in recognition of Lamb-Smith's influence, was dismantled, stored, and removed from the Caulfield campus in 1954, when the land it occupied was needed to erect six new classrooms. It was carefully re-assembled a couple of years later at the school's Yarra Junction property. It served a number of different purposes over the years; and, in 1989, extensive renovations converted Lamb Smith House into a far more comfortable recreation area for students visiting the "YJ" campus.
- A Lamb Smith Prize for Leadership is awarded to the most outstanding student leader during the school's leadership camps (which are conducted at the school's "YJ" campus).

== See also ==
- List of Caulfield Grammar School people
