= Tudor House School =

Location
- Moss Vale, New South Wales; Australia; 34°33′44.4092″S 150°24′18.6927″E

Information
- Type: Independent, co-educational since 2017, primary, day and boarding
- Motto: Latin: Indomino Confido
- Denomination: Anglican
- Established: 1897, relocated in 1901
- Founder: Inman
- Head of school: Adam Larby
- Employees: 17
- Enrolment: 270 (K–6)
- Colours: Red, blue and white
- Slogan: Learning for life
- Website: www.tudorhouse.nsw.edu.au

Tudor House School is a private, day and boarding, preparatory school for boys and girls at Moss Vale, New South Wales, Australia.

The school is Australia's only preparatory boarding school. It became co-educational in 2017.

Tudor House has a non-selective enrolment policy and currently caters for boys and girls from Kindergarten to year 6, with boarding available for boys and girls in years 3–6.

It is part of The King's School, Parramatta, New South Wales.

== History ==
Established in 1897, Tudor House moved from Sydney to its present rural site in Moss Vale in 1902. The founder, Mr Inman, wanted a school that educated the whole boy.

== Campus ==
Tudor House School is situated on 70 hectares (170 acres) of farming land in the Southern Highlands of New South Wales, about 1.5 hours south of Sydney.

The campus features tree groves and an orchard, dams and creeks, playing ovals, including five cricket ovals, three rugby union fields, and two soccer fields, a 25-metre heated swimming pool, two tennis courts, gymnasium, classrooms for Upper School (Years 4–6) and Lower School (K–Year 3), a boarding house, a school hospital staffed by a registered nurse, and specialist rooms including an art room, woodwork workshop, computer lab, library, music and drama centre.

== Notable alumni ==
- Edward Cowan – cricket captain in 1994, played for New South Wales Blues and now Tasmanian Tigers and Australian Cricket Team.
- Malcolm Fraser – former Australian Prime Minister
- Donald Friend – artist
- Robert Klippel – sculptor and artist
- James Packer – (cricket & school captain) – head of the Packer empire, son of Kerry Packer
- James W. Lance – neurologist
- David Moore – photojournalist, founder of the Australian Centre for Photography.
- Patrick White – (dux) – author, Nobel laureate (Literature, 1973)

== Notable faculty ==
Hugh Gemmell Lamb-Smith (1889–1951), an Australian educator who, as a member of the Second Field Ambulance unit, landed at Anzac Cove on 25 April 1915, taught at Tudor House in the late 1900s; he was a member of the staff of Caulfield Grammar School, both as teacher and administrator, from 1913 to 1951.

== See also ==
- List of non-government schools in New South Wales
- List of boarding schools
- The King's School, Sydney
