= Allan F. Sierp =

Allan Frederick Sierp (17 May 1905 – 28 September 1982) was a South Australian artist, writer of a series of technical drawing books used in Australian schools, Head of the South Australian School of Art in the 1960s.

He was generally known as "Allan F. Sierp", and was a distinguished Adelaide violinist, L.T.C.L. (Licentiate of Trinity College London), who was active in Adelaide 1920-1950

== History ==
He was a son of Alfred R. F. Sierp (ca. 1865 – 9 August 1945) and his wife Elsie S. Sierp née Cook (ca. 12 March 1879 – 24 August 1971).

He studied at the School of Arts and Crafts and dominated the 1928 Examinations, when he sat for 11 technical drawing subjects, passing with Honours in eight and a Credit in three. He worked as a draughtsman in the State public service, then the Education Department, becoming South Australia's first Inspector of Art. It was around this time that he wrote the first of what became classic textbooks of technical drawing, and would over the ensuing 30 years go through multiple editions, including new metric editions in 1972.

In 1948, he was a senior master at Adelaide High School.

He was Principal of the South Australian School of Arts 1961–1964, and was in charge of its removal from North Terrace to North Adelaide in 1962.

== Other activities ==
He designed the coat of arms for the City of Prospect in 1934.

He produced volumes of South Australian photographs from the colonial era, followed by similar volumes dealing with New South Wales and Tasmania.

He was involved in stage design and set painting for amateur theatricals.

== Publications ==
- Lettering and layout for art students Sands & McDougall, 1939 (22 eds.)
- A basic course in technical drawing Angus & Robertson, Sydney, 1948
- A basic course in technical drawing (new metric edition) Angus & Robertson, Sydney, 1972
- Perspective projection for technical, art, and high schools Sands & McDougall, 1945
- Perspective projection for technical, art, and high schools (new metric edition) Sands & McDougall, 1974
- An advanced course in geometrical drawing Sands & McDougall, Adelaide, 1948 (11 eds.)
- Applied perspective : the theory and practice of perspective for architects, industrial designers, artists and draughtsmen Angus & Robertson, Sydney, 1958
- Colonial life in South Australia : fifty years of photography, 1855–1905 Rigby, Adelaide, ca.1969
- Colonial life in New South Wales : fifty years of photography, 1855–1905 Rigby, Adelaide, 1974.
- Colonial life in Tasmania : fifty years of photography, 1855–1905 Adelaide Rigby, Adelaide, 1976.
- Colonial life in Victoria : fifty years of photography 1855–1905 Rigby, Adelaide, 1972

== Family ==
Allan married Catherine Lillias "Kitty" Rowe (1907–2002) on 18 April 1931. Their children included three daughters and two sons.
