= Roy Dalgarno =

Australian artist (1910–2001)

- Born: 2 December 1910
- Died: 1 February 2001 (aged 90)
- Education: National Gallery Art School; Academy of Art; East Sydney Technical College; Ecole des Beaux Arts; Pratt Graphic Centre
- Movement: Social Realism

Frederick Leslie Roy Dalgarno (2 December 1910 – 1 February 2001) was an Australian social realist artist.

== Early life, education and training ==
Born in Melbourne, Victoria (Australia) in 1910, Dalgarno was educated at Ballarat Grammar School. From 1926 to 1930 he attended National Gallery Art School in Melbourne, where he met social realists Noel Counihan and Herbert McClintock. He then attended the Academy of Art under Dattilo Rubbo from 1930 to 1932. From 1932 to 1934 he attended East Sydney Technical College Painting & Drawing. Later, between 1951 and 1953 he was at Ecole des Beaux Arts in Paris, including in 1951–52 William Hayter's Atelier 17 (etching). In 1980 he studied etching and collography at the Pratt Graphic Centre, New York.

== Career ==
He joined the Communist Party of Australia in the 1930s but, according to art historian Bernard Smith, his bohemian temperament was incompatible with party puritanism. He left the party in 1949. In the late 1930s he travelled to the canefields of North Queensland, where he concentrated on his painting.

He co-founded the Studio of Realist Art (SORA) Sydney in 1945. From 1947 to 1949 he worked as lecturer at the East Sydney Technical College. After studying in Paris, he moved to India, where he co-founded Editions Anarkali, publisher of fine arts in Bombay, while being employed as a visiting lecturer in lithography at the School of Fine Arts.

In 1953 he won the First Prize for Diploma Students, lithography, at the Ecole des Beaux Arts, Paris. In 1965 he won first prize at the Mahasartra State (India) exhibition.

In 1975 he moved to Auckland, New Zealand, where he worked as a lecturer in drawing and composition at the Auckland Society of Arts.

== Death ==
Dalgarno died in Auckland of pneumonia in 2001.

== Legacy ==
Described as a socialist bohemian and a social realist painter, his work commissioned by the Australian maritime and mining trade unions is perhaps the best remembered, for its depiction of Australian workers and working conditions.

The art historian Bernard Smith wrote of Dalgarno: "He belongs to that great generation of social realist Australian artists who flourished during World War II and early post-war years but – in the aftermath of the Cold War – are now largely stored and forgotten by curators." ('Artist of the Everyday' The Australian, 23 February 2001)
