= Noel Counihan =

Australian artist (1913–1986)

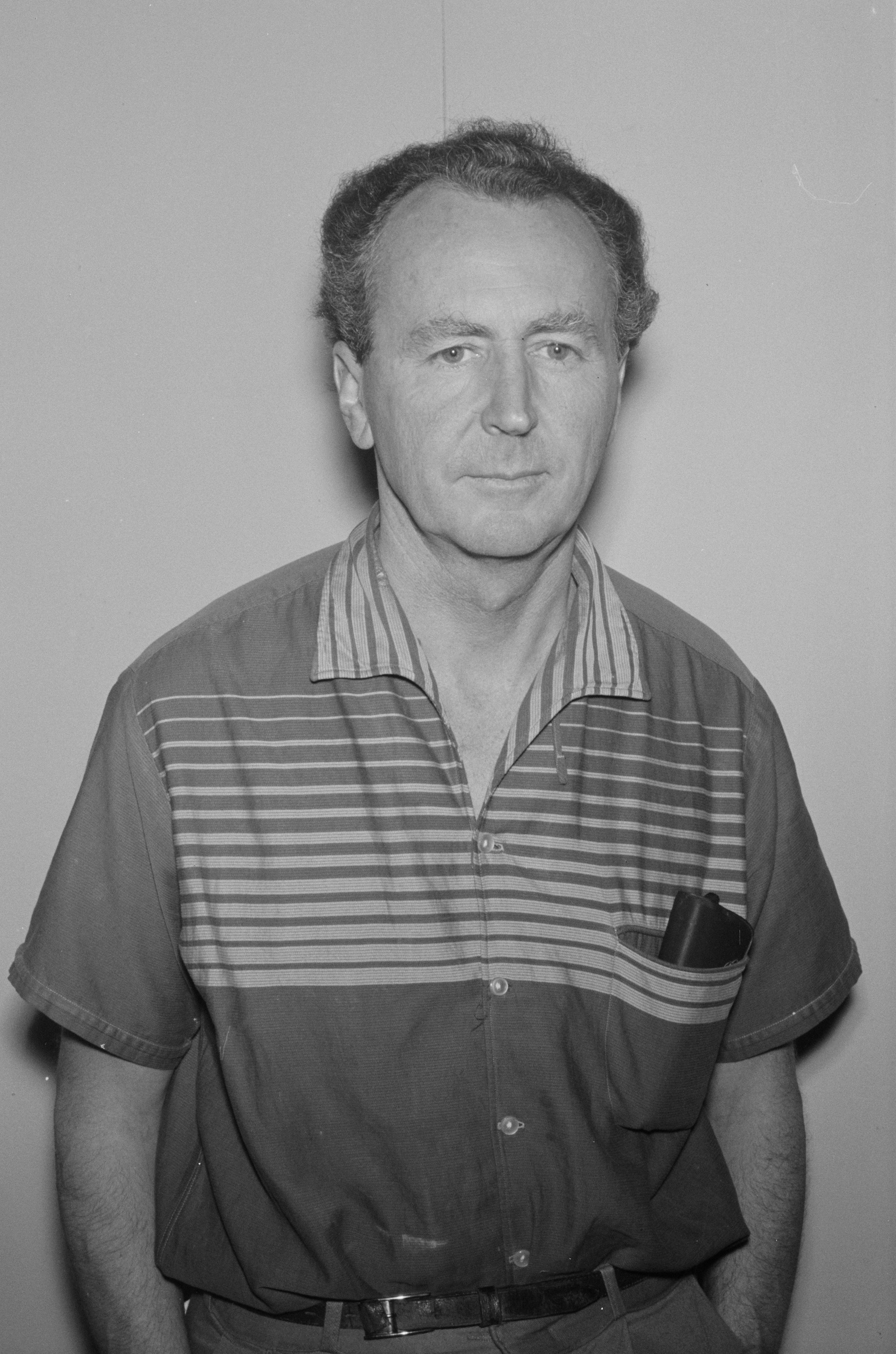
- Counihan, c. 1964
- Born: 4 October 1913; Albert Park, Melbourne
- Died: 5 July 1986 (aged 72); Canterbury, Melbourne
- Education: Caulfield Grammar School; National Gallery of Victoria Art School
- Movement: Social realism

Noel Jack Counihan (4 October 1913 – 5 July 1986) was an Australian social realist painter, printmaker, cartoonist and illustrator active in the 1940s and 1950s in Melbourne. An atheist, communist, and art activist, Counihan made art in response to the politics and social hardships of his times. He is regarded as one of Australia's major artists of the 20th century.

== Early life ==
Counihan was born on 4 October 1913 in Albert Park, then a working-class suburb of Melbourne. He attended the St Paul's Cathedral, Melbourne Choir school (closed in 1929), then Caulfield Grammar School in 1928. He studied part-time under Charles Wheeler at the National Gallery of Victoria Art School in Melbourne during 1930–31, where he met the social realists Herbert McClintock and Roy Dalgarno.

== Career ==
Social realism, the belief that art should reflect the realities of society under capitalism, was the artistic doctrine of the Communist Party of Australia, and in 1931 Counihan became a confirmed atheist and a member of the Party. He helped found the Workers Art Guild, and began printmaking, producing linocuts and lithographs for Communist magazine covers and pamphlets as well as designing banners.

During the Great Depression Counihan participated in the "free speech" fights in Brunswick, organised by the Communist Party in response to a Victorian state government law banning "subversive" gatherings. Dozens of members of the Unemployed Workers Movement were arrested, and unemployed meetings at the intersection of Phoenix Street and Sydney Road, Brunswick, were dispersed by police. As part of this fight, Counihan addressed a crowd on 19 May 1933 from within a locked cart to prevent arrest. Police had to cut him out, to the jeers of the crowd, as he continued speaking.

From 1934 Counihan worked as a cartoonist for various publications, including The Bulletin and the Communist Party's paper, the Guardian, from 1945 to 1949 and again from 1952 to 1958. He spent extended periods in hospital with tuberculosis during World War II. With the encouragement of the artist Yosl Bergner, he began to paint. He developed a personal style based on the social realist approach, producing compassionate images of workers and their working lives. Counihan maintained that the artist had a duty to "gather information from the political developments of the time". Counihan acknowledged George Finey as a major influence on his art.

His 1955 painting On Parliament Steps won the George Crouch Memorial Prize in 1956.

Counihan remained loyal to the Communist Party during its various splits and despite its declining support in the 1970s and 1980s.

His 1973 posthumous portrait of Hugh Gemmell Lamb-Smith – who had taught Counihan at Caulfield Grammar and, as well, had encouraged his artistic endeavours whilst he was there – largely painted from memory, and commissioned by the Caulfield Grammarians' Association, is on permanent display within the school's "Cripps Centre" on its Caulfield Campus.

In 1979, Counihan contributed the entry on footballer Roy Cazaly to volume 7 of the Australian Dictionary of Biography.

== Death ==
On 5 July 1986, Counihan died in Canterbury, Melbourne, aged 72.

== Legacy ==
The Counihan Gallery, managed by City of Merri-bek Council, is named in his honour. To mark its tenth anniversary, Edwina Bartlem curated an exhibition in which contemporary artists created works inspired by the art and ideas of Counihan. The artists included George Gittoes and Angela Cavalieri.

A short distance away from the Gallery, outside the Brunswick Mechanics Institute on Sydney Road, a Free Speech memorial has been built by artist Simon Perry to commemorate the free speech fights by the unemployed in 1933 and Noel Counihan's part in them.

The Geelong Gallery held an exhibition of his works, titled "A People's Press", from 2 November 2024 to 10 March 2025.

== Selected works ==
- The Cough... Stone Dust (1947)
- A Metal Pourer (1948)
- Eureka 1854–1954 linocuts (1954)
- On Parliament Steps (1955)
- Sunset Dance (1968)
- Image of Lear lithographs (1977)
- Face Im (1978)
- At the Start of the March 1932 (1944)
