= Ruth Tuck =

Australian painter

- "The Triple Mirror" self-portrait of Ruth Tuck
- Born: Ruth Edith Tuck; 22 July 1914; Cowell, South Australia
- Died: 8 October 2008 (aged 94)
- Known for: Painting
- Spouse: Mervyn Ashmore Smith (m. 1943)

Ruth Edith Tuck OAM (22 July 1914 – 10 October 2008) was a modernist painter of South Australia, noted for joint exhibitions with her husband Mervyn Ashmore Smith (11 December 1904 – 18 March 1994), and her influence as a teacher of painting. The Ruth Tuck Art School, founded by her in 1955, continues to operate in Adelaide. She was related to the better-known Marie Tuck.

== Early life and education ==
Ruth Edith Tuck was born on 22 July 1914 at Cowell, South Australia, a daughter of Arthur Edward Tuck (1855 – 8 April 1925) and his wife Minnie, née Wallis.

== Career ==
She studied painting under Dorrit Black and exhibited regularly with the Royal South Australian Society of Arts and was a foundation member of the Contemporary Art Society.

She met Mervyn Smith in 1943 and married him on 15 October the same year; they lived in Adelaide, then Mervyn moved to Newcastle, New South Wales in 1949, where he was employed as a County Council planning officer; she joined him few years later. In 1953 they returned to Adelaide, where they remained and held numerous joint exhibitions of their watercolors, both modernist in outlook with Mervyn's work being generally characterised as the more ambitious.

== Publications ==
Her written work includes biographies of Mary Packer Harris and Marie Anne Tuck for the Australian Dictionary of Biography.

== Ruth Tuck Art School ==
Ruth established the Ruth Tuck Art School in 1955.

== Recognition and honours ==
Tuck was awarded the Medal of the Order of Australia in 1981 for services to art.

The Ruth Tuck Scholarship for Visual Arts was awarded by the state government via Carclew until 2016.

== Death and legacy ==
Tuck died on 10 October 2008.

The Ruth Tuck Art School continues to operate, at the Burnside Arts and Crafts Centre, in Hubbe Court, Burnside.

== Family ==
Ruth was a granddaughter of noted Baptist minister Rev. Henry Lewer Tuck (11 September 1820 – 26 August 1880), an early immigrant to South Australia, whose brother Edward Starkey Tuck (13 March 1827 – 9 August 1898) was the father of Marie Tuck (5 September 1866 – 3 September 1947). See her article for more details of the Tuck family in South Australia.

Ruth had a son Mark in 1945 and twin daughters Michele and Angela in 1953.
