= Marie Tuck =

South Australian artist and educator (1866–1947)

- Self-portrait
- Born: Marie Anne Tuck; 5 September 1866; Mount Torrens, South Australia
- Died: 3 September 1947 (aged 80); Glen Osmond, South Australia
- Known for: Painting

Marie Anne Tuck (5 September 1866 – 3 September 1947), was an artist and art educator in South Australia.

== History ==
Marie Tuck was born at Mount Torrens, South Australia, one of eight children of Edward Starkey Tuck (1827 – 1898) and his wife Amy Harriet Tuck, née Tayler (1827 – 1901), on 5 September 1866, though she later claimed 1872 as her birth year. Her father was a schoolteacher at Mount Torrens.

From 1886 she received arts training at night classes with James Ashton at his Norwood studio, then in the late 1880s at his Adelaide Academy of Arts, while working at a Payneham plant nursery and assisting Ashton as a way of paying for her tuition while saving for her big ambition – to study in Paris. She was an early member of the Adelaide Easel Club. In 1896 she achieved Division 1 honours from the Royal Drawing Society of Great Britain and Ireland through her affiliation with James Ashton's Adelaide Academy of Arts.

Later in 1896 she moved to Perth, Western Australia, where she gave private tuition in her studio and established the Perth Art School in the Nicholl's Buildings in Wellington Street, Perth, opposite the Railway Station. She also worked at a photographer's studio in St George's Terrace, perhaps as a photo colorist. She exhibited in Western Australia including at the West Australian Society of Arts annual exhibitions while continuing to send artworks back to Adelaide for inclusion in the Adelaide Easel Club exhibitions and the Federal exhibitions.

It took ten years, but in 1906 she sailed by the Runic to Paris, and there studied under expatriate Australian Rupert Bunny, developing a great love of French people and culture. She exhibited at the "Old Salon" (salon of the Société des Artistes Français), receiving an honourable mention for her painting Toilette for the Bride (now held by the Queen Adelaide Club in Adelaide). While in France, Marie maintained her connection with Australia and in 1909 she was elected to the Art Society of NSW.

She returned to Australia in 1914, departing from Liverpool on 27 June aboard Medic, a White Star line steamship, bound for the Cape and Australia. On 3 August Germany declared war on her beloved France. Arriving back in Adelaide on 7 August 1914, she declared that if she had known about the outbreak of war, she would have stayed in France.

After her 1914 arrival back in South Australia, she rejoined the local artistic community and exhibited in Adelaide including at the Federal exhibitions. In 1919 she started teaching at the South Australian School of Arts and Crafts where she taught for twenty years. Her many students included Ivor Hele, Dora Cecil Chapman, David Dallwitz, Ivor Francis, Jacqueline Hick and Noel Wood.

She held exhibitions in her studio in the Onslow Buildings in Pirie Street and later at 74 Frome Street, Adelaide as well as exhibiting in the 1924 South Australian Society of Arts exhibition; impressionistic landscapes, figures and portraits in oils. She retired in 1940 and had a stroke, aged 74 years. She always had a passion for music and played a silver stringed spinet. Towards the end of her life she lived in Jane Street, Frewville, where she had her studio in the front room.

Marie was a prolific artist and her artworks are held by the Art Gallery of South Australia, the Art Gallery of NSW, the Museum and Art Gallery of the Northern Territory, the Queen Adelaide Club, the Australian National University and the University of Western Australia as well as in numerous private collections.

Marie Tuck never married and after her death in 1947, the Royal South Australian Society of Arts (RSASA) held the "Marie Tuck Memorial Exhibition" and at the opening John Dowie described her as the "mother of painting in South Australia". The "Marie Tuck Retrospective exhibition" was held at the Cricklewood Art Centre in Aldgate in 1971.

Ruth Tuck (1914–2008), water colorist and art teacher who married fellow-painter Mervyn Ashmore Smith OAM (1904–1994), and who founded her own art school in Burnside in 1955, was a first cousin, once removed, although the relationship was more like aunt and niece.

== Significant works ==
- Breton woman is held by the Art Gallery of S.A
- Onkaparinga Woollen Mill is held by the Art Gallery of SA.
- La Poissonnerie (The Fish Market), a huge canvas, was acquired by the Art Gallery of SA in 1908.''
- Toilette de la Mariée (Attirement of the Bride) is held by the Queen Adelaide Club in Adelaide.
- Jour de Lessive (Washing Day) is held by the Australian National University in Canberra.
- The Sewing Circle is held by the Cruthers Collection of Women's Art at the University of Western Australia.
- The Gossips is held by the Art Gallery of NSW in Sydney.
- The Red Geranium is held by the Adelaide Casino.
- Central Adelaide Market is held by the Andree Harkness Collection.

== Family ==
Henry Tuck (1781–1861) was married to Jane Tuck, née Starkey, (1783–1854), lived in Chelsea, London. Children who emigrated to Australia included:

- Rev. Henry Lewer Tuck (11 September 1820 – 26 August 1880) married Harriet Caroline Hodson (c. 1830 – 30 June 1909) on 3 October 1850, lived at Stockport, South Australia, was first president of the Baptist Union of South Australia.

- eldest son Arthur Edward Tuck (1855 – 8 April 1925), married Minnie Wallis on 7 March 1911, lived at Cowell, South Australia

- Ruth Edith Tuck (22 July 1914 – 10 October 2008), married Mervyn Ashmore Smith OAM (11 December 1904 – 18 March 1994) on 15 October 1943; both were modernist watercolorists. They had a son Mark in 1945 and twin daughters Michele and Angelina in 1953.

- Elizabeth Tuck (– 13 October 1883)
- Harriet Tuck (c. 1819 – 26 June 1887)
- Sophia Tuck (c. 1823 – 30 November 1906) of Kenton Valley, South Australia
- Edward Starkey Tuck (13 March 1827 – 9 August 1898) married Amy Harriet Tayler (29 April 1827 – 13 January 1901)

- Amy Jane Tayler Tuck (December 1849 – 4 October 1933) married George Edward Masters (–1912) in 1870
- Edward John Tayler Tuck (1853 – 10 June 1926) married Mary Ann "Annie" Tobell (– 11 August 1926) in 1875. He was a minister of religion in Broken Hill.
- Sophia Mary Tuck (1855–1943) Head Teacher Mt Torrens School (1877–1912) who undertook her teacher training in the first intake at Adelaide Teachers' College 1876.
- Bernard Henry Tuck (1858–1942) married Emma Jane Masters (–1922) on 28 September 1882, lived Forestville, South Australia
- Alfred Robert Tuck (1860–1938) married Elizabeth Roach (–1962) on 6 September 1888
- Henry Joseph "Harry" Tuck (15 May 1863 – 15 August 1946) married Eliza Playford (9 February 1866–1941) on 1 January 1889. Eliza was the second daughter of Hon. Thomas Playford
- Marie Anne Tuck (5 September 1866 – 3 September 1947)
- Elizabeth Frances Starkey "Francie" Tuck (1869 – 1 September 1946) trained as a school teacher, and had a career as a teacher of singing and piano. She had a short period in Europe, studying music and traveling. She also studied Art and acted as her sister, Marie's press agent, during the time that Marie Tuck was living in France.

== Exhibitions ==
- The Edwardians: Secrets and Desires at the Art Gallery of South Australian (2004)
- Dangerously Modern: Australian Women Artists in Europe 1890-1940.
