= Herbert McClintock =

Australian artist

Herbert McClintock (1906–1985) was an Australian social realist artist.

Born: 1906, Perth, Australia

Died: 1985 (age 79 years)

== Biography ==
McClintock was born in Perth, Western Australia. He studied at the National Gallery of Victoria Art School from 1925 to 1927 and again in 1930, where he met fellow social realists Noel Counihan and Roy Dalgarno. While a student, McClintock earned a living as a signwriter and advertising artist. He joined the Communist Party of Australia during the depression of the 1930s and did many political cartoons for communist publications. His cartoons were featured in trade union and communist papers throughout his life.

- Early work described as "constructivist"
- Mid-1930s working in a surrealist style, under the pseudonym "Max Ebert".
- Joined the Workers Art Guild
- Developed interest in Social Realism and chose to work only in this style using his own name.
- rejected for military service on medical grounds
- worked in an iron foundry; camouflage artist
- appointed 1943 as official war artist associated with the Civil Construction Corps.
