= John Christie Wright =

Australian sculptor

- Born: August 1889; Aberdeen, UK
- Died: 2 May 1917 (aged 27)
- Education: Robert Gordon's Technical College; Grays School of Art
- Notable work: Perpetuity
- Style: sculpture
- Awards: Wynne Prize

John Christie Wright (August 1889 – 2 May 1917), generally referred to as J. Christie Wright, was a Scottish-born Australian sculptor.

== Early life and education ==
John Christie Wright's birth record indicates that he was born in Aberdeen on August 1889 to Margaret Wright (née Christie) and Moses Simpson Wright. The death record for Moses Wright shows he died when John was just 6 months of age. It is believed that Margaret Wright returned to her original place of residence at "Waulkmill", Rothiemay, Banffshire, Scotland sometime after John completed his education.

Wright was educated in Aberdeen at Robert Gordon's Technical College (now known as Robert Gordon's College), and then the Grays School of Art from 1907 to 1911, where he studied painting and sculpture under William Banbury and Harold T. Hughes, during which time he won the £50 Byrne scholarship.

The Robert Gordon's College and Gray's School of Art Central Institution General Register (Session 1904–1905) indicates that in the First Year Lithographers' & Engravers' Course he was an exceptional student, achieving a 1st Grade in Drawing with marks of 97 (Examination); 96 (Laboratory Work), and; 99 (Class & Oral Work).

He was later awarded the Scottish national diploma in sculpture by Sir George Frampton, (the only one won that year). He studied modelling and architecture under Beresford Pite at the Royal College of Art in London.

== Career in Australia ==
Wright emigrated to Australia, arriving in Melbourne in May 1912, and was appointed the first lecturer in art at the Teachers' College of Sydney University.

He created a large-scale model of Sydney's new Zoological Gardens, and was then engaged by G. H. Godsell of the architectural firm Robertson and Marks to create reliefs for the facade of the Daily Telegraph (now known as The Trust Building, located at 72-72A Castlereagh Street, Sydney) and that of the Perpetual Trustee Company Building, located on Hunter Street, Sydney. The Telegraph works were the bronzes Commerce and Knowledge and the fine Arts and stone figures Justice and Truth. The statue Perpetuity for the Perpetual Trustee Company won for him the Wynne Prize in 1915 (an annual Australian prize for "the best landscape painting of Australian scenery in oils or watercolours or for the best example of figure sculpture by Australian artists completed during the 12 months preceding the [closing] date").

He designed medals for the (Sydney) Society of Artists to commemorate the landing of Australian troops at Gallipoli on 23 April 1915.

He was appointed Principal of the Adelaide School of Art (previously School of Design) in February 1916, at the age of 26, following the retirement and death of H. P. Gill, and set about reorganising it as the South Australian School of Arts and Crafts. He enlisted on 13 April 1916 and was temporarily replaced by Fred C. Britton. The selection committee was aware of his enlistment but felt this should not disqualify him from appointment.

== Death and legacy ==
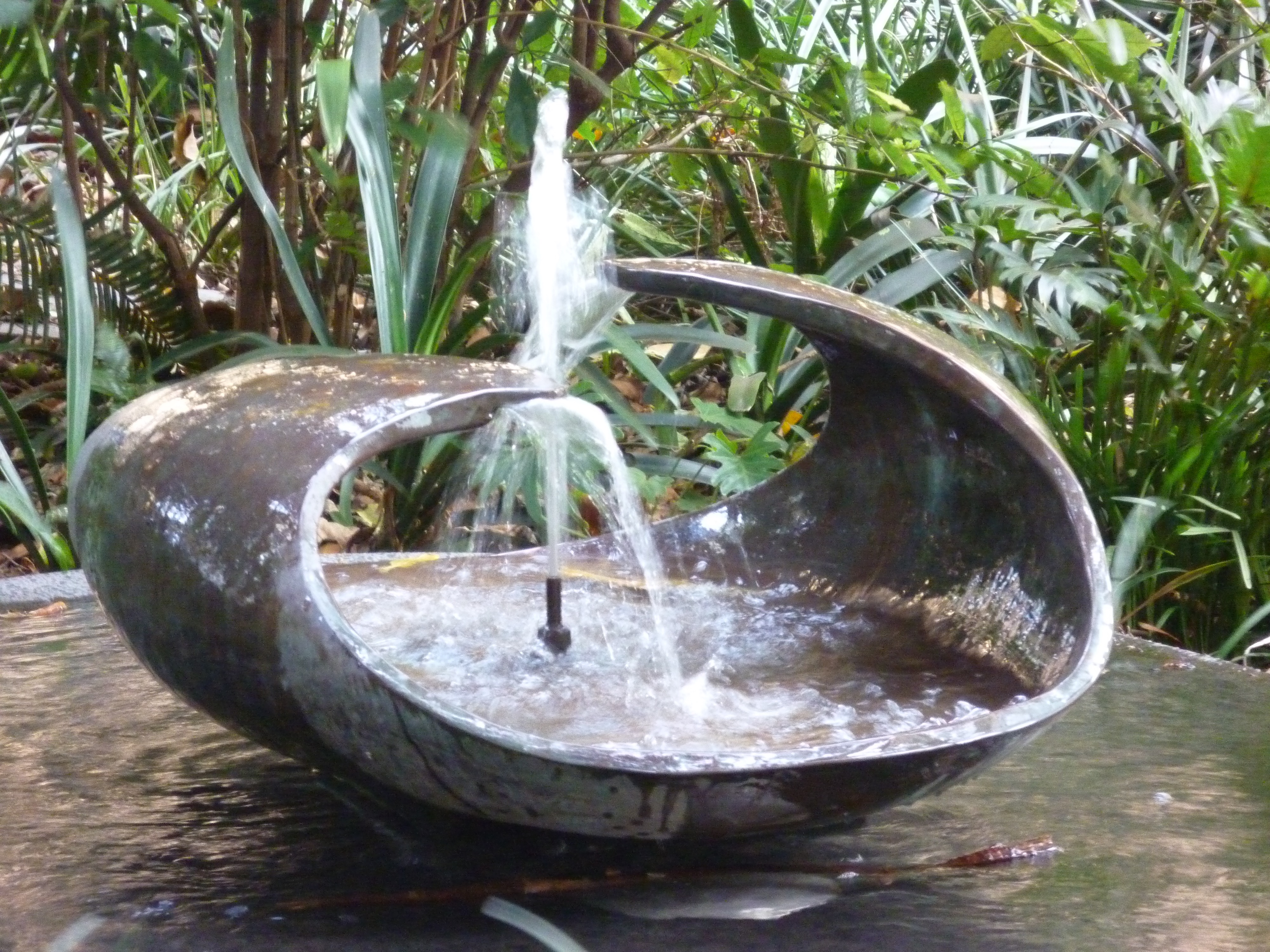
John Christie Wright Memorial Fountain in Macquarie Place, Sydney.

He served in World War I with the Australian Imperial Forces, and as Lieutenant Wright, was killed in action in France in 1917. He is commemorated at the Australian National Memorial near the Village of Villers-Bretonneaux, which lies 16 kilometres (9.9 mi) east of Amiens. His service and death are also commemorated on the War Memorial of his hometown of Rothiemay, Aberdeenshire.

In an article in the 19 May 1917 edition of the Adelaide "Advertiser", the Premier of South Australia, Crawford Vaughan, said:

The news of the death of Lieutenant Wright, principal of the Adelaide School of Art, came as a great blow to me. Lieutenant Wright was a young man of high attainments and of brilliant promise. He was selected by the Government for the post of principal of the School of Art after he had actually enlisted, but he was able to devote a few weeks before he left for the front to reorganising his department. In that brief time he displayed excellent capabilities as a teacher and as an organiser. As a sculptor he attained high distinction, and his figures which cap the 'Sydney Daily Telegraph' building are a particularly fine artistic achievement, both in conception and execution. He was a man who could ill be spared, but, having heard the cry and call of duty, he went forth to fight for the liberty of others.

A memorial prize, believed to have been donated by Gertrude Halley in his name, awarded annually to a student at the South Australian School of Arts, known as the John Christie Wright Memorial Prize for Life Drawing and Painting.

There is a memorial fountain in his honour in Macquarie Place Park, Sydney, which was commissioned by Jean Hague-Smith (née Anderson) in 1960 and designed by Gerald Lewers.
