= Noel Wood =

Australian painter

- Born: 1 February 1912; Strathalbyn, South Australia, Australia
- Died: 10 November 2001 (aged 88)
- Occupation: Painter
- Spouse: Eleanor Weld Skipper
- Children: Virginia Maray; Ann Grocott

Noel Herbert Wood (1 February 1912 – 10 November 2001) was an Australian painter. Wood was a prolific landscape painter, well known for his island lifestyle. His work is found in numerous public collections in Australia and overseas.

== Early life ==
Wood was born in 1912 in Strathalbyn, South Australia. He was the fourth son of Rev. Tom Percy Wood and Fannie (née Newbury). His eldest brother, Rex Wood (1906–1970) was also a noted artist. His grandfather, Thomas Percy Wood (1855–1937) was an accomplished watercolourist. He attended Art School in Adelaide where his tutor was Marie Tuck.

Wood met Eleanor Weld Skipper, whom he married in 1933, at Art School in Adelaide. They lived and painted on Kangaroo Island, residing in the house of Noel's brother, Dean, for two years. Seeking a place where Wood could paint without paying rent, they purchased 15 acres on Bedarra Island, North Queensland and made a grass shack in which to live before building a home they called the "House of Singing Bamboo". Wood called the island a place "with a warm climate, where one could live for approximately nothing and solve one’s own problems in paint and colour". He and his wife had two daughters, Virginia Maray and Ann Grocott.

== Career ==
Wood became a sensation in Sydney early in his career, following a January 1939 exhibition of 50 paintings at the David Jones Gallery. The media began to refer to Wood as "Artist Crusoe" and the "Robinson Crusoe of Art".

Soon after World War II, Wood packaged fifty of his best paintings to exhibit in London at Leicester Galleries. The exhibition was to be opened by the British painter, Augustus John. The crate of works was despatched on Queensland Rail but went missing en route and never reached Sydney, where Wood awaited them. It was never found. While bitterly disappointed, Wood took ship to London in 1947, and he painted in England, Ireland, France and Italy, paving his way by producing portraits, until returning to Bedarra after several months in Europe.

In the 1950s, he was invited to the United States where he worked as an assistant art director in Hollywood.

Wood ultimately spent 60 years painting on Bedarra Island. In 1987 he was the subject of the documentary The Island and the Painter produced by the Australian Broadcasting Corporation.

== Collections ==
- Art Gallery of South Australia
- Cairns Art Gallery
- Heide Museum of Modern Art
- Queensland Art Gallery
- New England Regional Art Museum.

== Death ==
Noel Wood died in Tully, North Queensland, in 2001 at the age of 89.
