= Fred C. Britton =

Australian painter

Frederick Christian Britton (21 May 1889 – 14 December 1931) was an artist and arts educator in South Australia and New South Wales.

== History ==
Britton was born in Peckham, London and studied painting at the Brook Green School of Art, then the Slade School of Fine Art, London under Professor Henry Tonks and the Hammersmith School of Arts and Crafts. In 1908 he served as official artist for Flinders Petrie's archaeological expedition to Egypt and moved to Adelaide, South Australia in 1910 or 1911, and joined the staff of the South Australian School of Art under J. Christie Wright, then in 1916 served as his replacement when he went off to war. He enlisted in April 1918 and served as an official War Artist, in the same unit as Web Gilbert and Louis McCubbin.

He returned to Adelaide and for a time worked for publishers Tyrrell's Ltd., then in August 1921 was appointed by Edith Napier Birks as founding painting master of the School of Fine Arts, North Adelaide. He was a member of the South Australian Society of Arts, but quite critical of a section of its membership. In 1927 he moved to Sydney, replaced by F. Millward Grey, to join the advertising studio of Smith and Julius, then was appointed to the East Sydney Technical College.

== Works ==
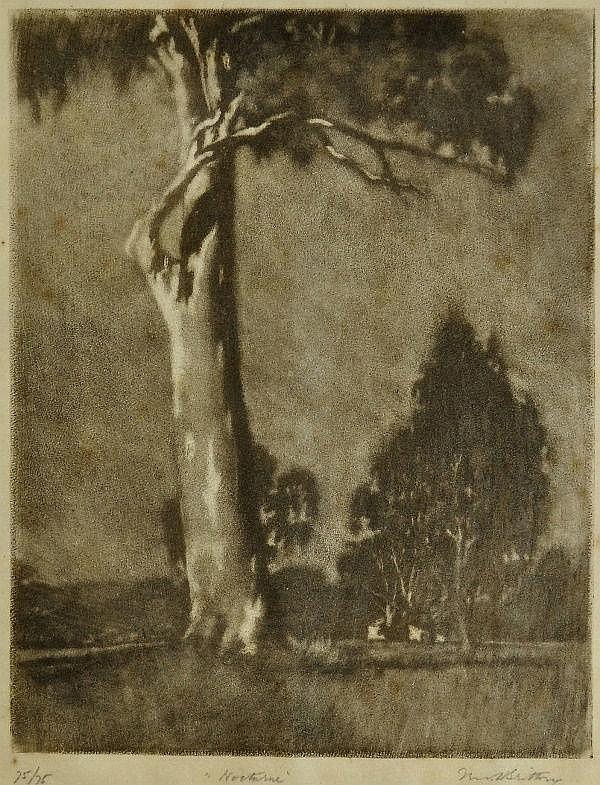
'Nocturne' Mezzotint

Britton is represented in the following collections:

- Carrick Hill
- National Gallery of Victoria On the Murray (etching) view here
- Powerhouse Museum Demolition of the Old Sydney Mint (1927 Etching)
- Historic Houses Trust Hyde Park Barracks & District Court view here
- Art Gallery of South Australia

- Railway Station, Adelaide (1924 pencil drawing) view here;
- "Granny" Euniapon of Point McLeay (1916 crayon sketch). Elsewhere spelled "Unaipon".
- Pininbingerie, companion piece to the above.

== Family ==
He married Annie "Nance" Russell in 1912; they had one daughter Zara.
