= Louis Tannert =

German painter (1831–1915)

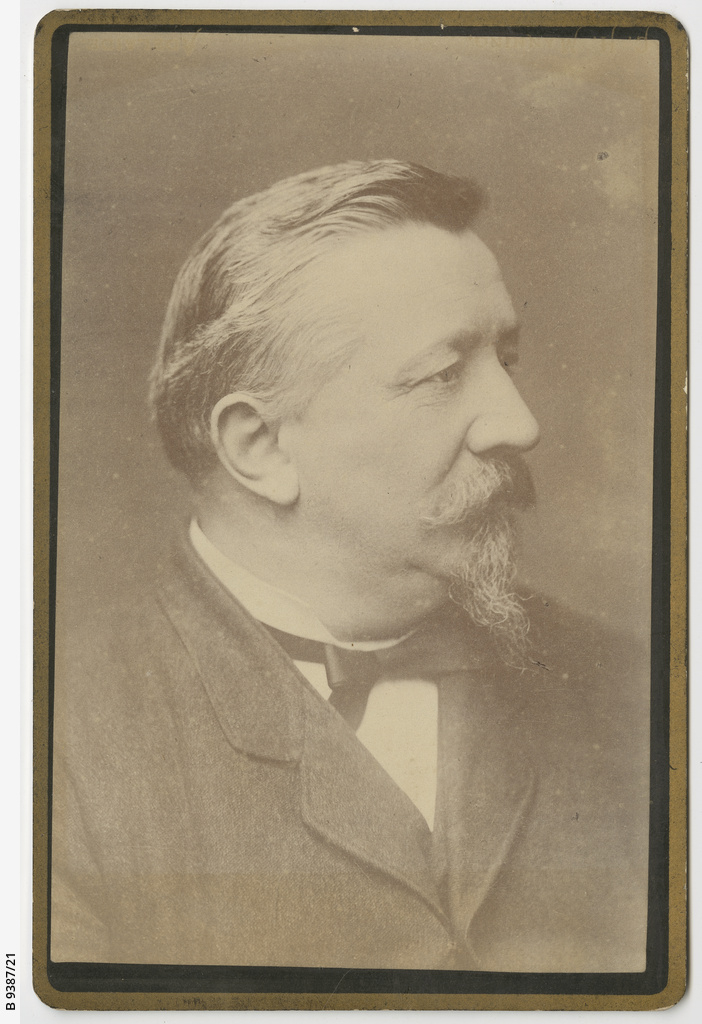
- Born: October 28, 1831
- Died: March 26, 1915 (aged 83) 26 March 1915; Melbourne

Louis August Ludwig Tannert (28 October 1831 – 26 March 1915), who has also been referred to as W. L. Tannert, was a painter from Germany who had a significant career as art educator and curator in South Australia.

He studied at the Düsseldorf school of painting and the Royal Academy of Dresden.

He arrived in Melbourne on board the Kent on 17 December 1876 and was soon showing his works in the city, mostly genre paintings in the style of the Düsseldorf school of painting.

On the recommendation of Eugene von Guerard he was offered the position of head master of the South Australian School of Design, which he took up in October 1881. He resigned in 1892 and returned to Germany but died in Melbourne.

He was curator of the Art Gallery of South Australia 1882–1889.

== Some works ==
- Woman Spinning Düsseldorf 1870 Art Gallery of South Australia
- The Birthday etching after oil painting by Tannert

The Birthday; description

- Our Lady of Lourdes in St. Ignatius' Church, Richmond, Victoria.
- Paddy's Market 1878 National Gallery of Australia
- Children's Concert ca.1881 Art Gallery of South Australia
- Portrait of E. T. Smith, 1882
- Aboriginal Queen 1891 Art Gallery of South Australia
