= South Australian School of Art =

Art school in Adelaide, Australia

Coordinates: 34°55′24″S 138°35′29″E

The South Australian School of Art (SASA), originally the South Australian School of Design and for some time Adelaide School of Art, is part school the University of South Australia. As of 2025 it is part of UniSA Creative, which includes the disciplines of architecture and planning; art and design; journalism, communication, and media; film, television, and visual effects; and the creative industries. The South Australian School of Design was an art school in the earliest days of the City of Adelaide, South Australia.

== History ==
=== South Australian School of Design (1861) ===
In 1856 Charles Hill started a private School of Art in Pulteney Street, where, in that same year, the South Australian Society of Arts was formed. In 1861 the South Australian School of Design was founded under the management of the Society of Arts and connected with the South Australian Institute, with Charles Hill in charge. In 1862 enrolments were low and decreasing, rising slightly to 21 students in 1863. From the beginning, students were encouraged to show their work at Society exhibitions, and special prizes were offered for members of the School. This led to much mediocre work being shown, but acted as an impetus to native talent. By 1868 there were three classes: girls, boys, and young men, with an average attendance of 25. The school moved into a larger hall at the Institute previously reserved as exhibition space, and the small schoolroom handed over to F. G. Waterhouse, curator of the South Australian Institute Museum (now South Australian Museum). A large consignment of busts and statues had been donated by the Royal Society to add to the plaster models already in use for drawing "in the round".

Charles Hill retired in 1881 and the Board of Governors decided to re-form the School into a School of Design and a School of Painting, and, after recruitment for a replacement in England had fallen through, it was decided to appoint only one master in the first instance. Eugene von Guerard of Melbourne recommended Louis Tannert, who started in October 1881 as head of the School of Design, later head of the School of Painting. H. P. Gill was appointed in London in 1882 as head of the School of Design. In 1887 G. A. Reynolds was brought in as first assistant; in 1891 he transferred to the Education Department.

Tannert retired in 1892 and the two schools were reunited as the School of Design and Painting with Gill in charge. The syllabus was broadened with additional subjects, including china painting, under Rosa Fiveash. In February 1893 Elizabeth Armstrong was appointed as Painting Mistress to replace Tannert's teaching duties and she remained at the school until 1929. A Port Adelaide branch of the School of Design was formed sometime before October 1893.

Sample work from students was sent to the Department of Science and Art, South Kensington for assessment, and students who had reached their standards of proficiency were awarded either the Art Class Teacher's Certificate, or Art Class Master's Certificate.

Early in 1894 the School's title was changed to School of Design, Painting and Technical Art, and the school's ceramic kiln went into operation. The school occupied two floors and incorporated four large classrooms.

=== Education Department (1909) ===
In mid-1909 responsibility for the management of the school was handed over to the Education Department, and renamed Adelaide School of Art, but with no immediate change of function, courses, or staff. Trainee teachers constituted a substantial proportion of its students.

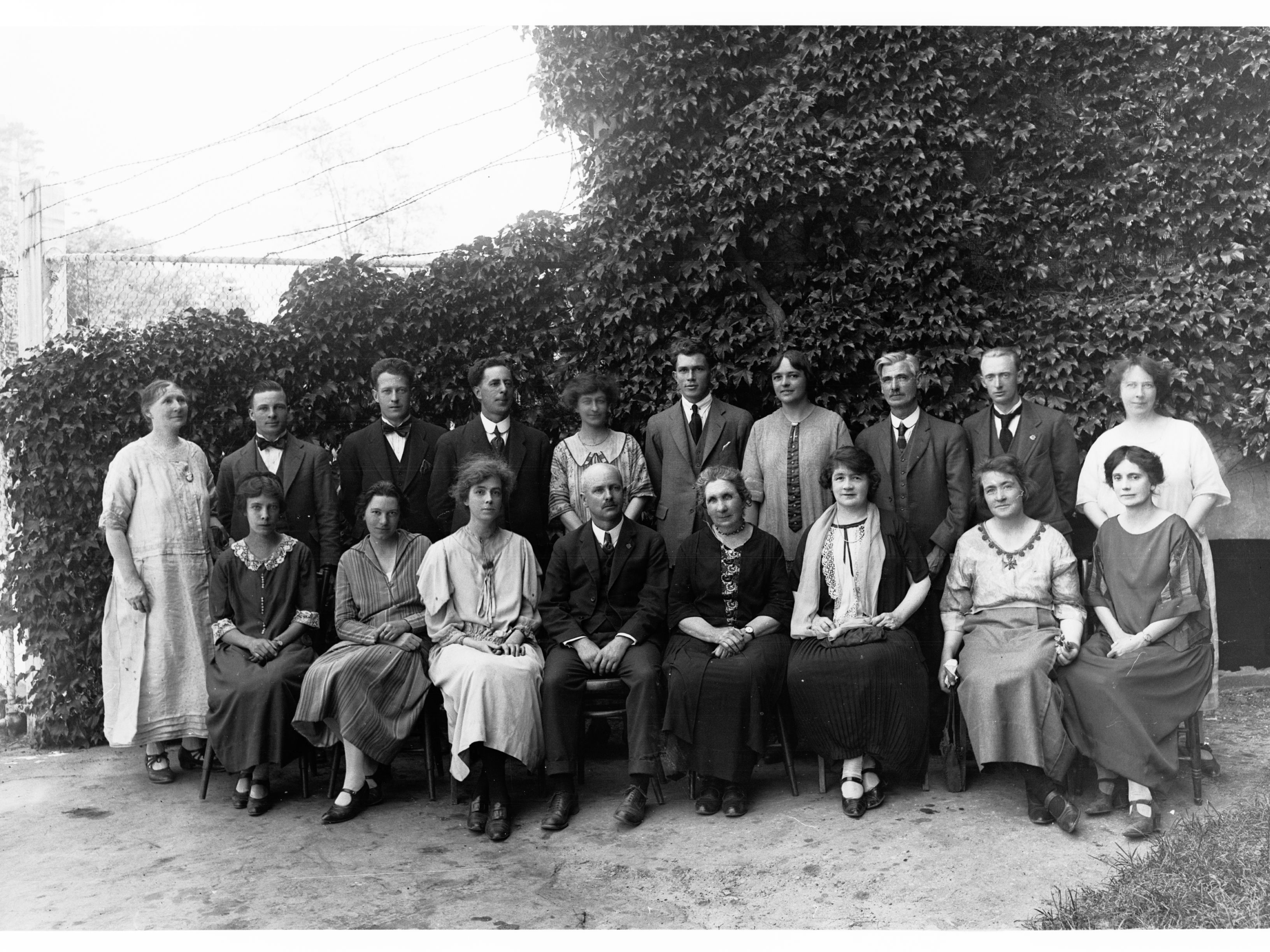
Several of the Adelaide School of Art era teachers in 1925, including L. H. Howie (front row, centre), Elizabeth Armstrong, (front row, 4th from right), and Charles J. Pavia (back row, 4th from left).

From 1910 to 1916 the school was housed in the Jubilee Exhibition Building, not a popular choice, as the building was not heated in winter. When during the flu epidemic of 1919 that building was turned into a nursing hospital and quarantine station, the school moved to the old Destitute Asylum on Kintore Avenue. Gill resigned in July 1915 after suffering ill-health for a year or so. He left Australia to return to England, but died en route in May 1916. J. Christie Wright was appointed his replacement, commencing in February 1916, and set about reorganising it as the South Australian School of Arts and Crafts. He enlisted with the First AIF on 13 April 1916, with the assurance of being re-hired on his safe return, and his responsibilities were shared by C. J. Pavia, who handled administrative duties and Geometrical Drawing and Fred C. Britton in charge of all other subjects. Wright was killed in France in 1917. Britton left in 1918 to work as a war artist, and Pavia acted as principal for around three years. L. H. Howie returned from his wartime duties in 1920 and was appointed to the position, retiring in 1941. He recruited staff members Marie Tuck and Ethel Barringer, and the Girls' Central Art School was created as a school within a school during the 1930s. Jacqueline Hick, who was later to teach at the school, attained the highest aggregate in her third year of studies at the Girls' school in 1937.

John Goodchild took over, and was appointed to the post in 1944, but left the following year to act as war artist for the RAAF. F. Millward Grey was his temporary replacement, made permanent in 1946, serving until 1956.

Ken Lamacraft (Note: Kenneth Ronald Ross Lamacraft (1912–1996), whose parents were prominent Scout leaders, was educated at Unley High School and the School of Arts and Crafts, then taught at Thebarton and Goodwood Boys' Technical Schools.) was the next principal, followed by Douglas Roberts 1957–1958, in which year the school's title changed yet again, to South Australian School of Art, abbreviated as SASA. Paul Beadle led the school from 1958 to 1960, then Allan Sierp from 1961 to 1964, followed by Douglas Roberts again.

=== 1960s–70s ===
For some time during the 1960s and 1970s, the school was located in a new building made of breeze block in Stanley Street, North Adelaide. There, students and staff came in contact with the Contemporary Art Society of SA, and the newly-formed Experimental Art Foundation (est. 1974) and Women's Art Movement (1976), where social relevance and collective action were paramount. Many ideas and people of varied backgrounds and experience came together, and this influenced the school's teaching. In the 1970s, a more project-based approach was introduced, along with the study of other media, such as photographic, installation, and performance art.

=== Timeline of name changes and locations ===
Timeline showing changes of name and locations:

- 1861: South Australian School of Design
- 1881: the School split into the School of Design and the School of Painting
- 1892: the two Schools merged into the School of Design and Painting
- 1894: School of Design, Painting and Technical Art
- 1909: Adelaide School of Art
- 1916: South Australian School of Arts and Crafts
- 1958: South Australian School of Art
- 1963: move from the Exhibition Building to Stanley Street, North Adelaide
- 1973: SASA merged with Western Teachers College to form Torrens College of Advanced Education

== University of South Australia ==
The South Australian School of Art was incorporated into the University of South Australia (UniSA) at Underdale in 1991. Gradually during the 1990s it was moved back to North Terrace, at the City West campus of UniSA. The move was completed in 2005.

In 2009, the SA School of Art amalgamated with the Louis Laybourne Smith School of Architecture, becoming the School of Art, Architecture and Design. In 2025 this school was incorporated into UniSA Creative, which includes the disciplines of architecture and planning; art and design; journalism, communication, and media; film, television, and visual effects; and the creative industries. It is one of very few art schools in Australia offering a multidisplinary approach.
