= Buford (given name) =

Buford is a given name of English origins. Notable people with it include:

- Buford Abner, American songwriter
- Buford Allison, professional football player
- Buford Ellington, 42nd governor of Tennessee
- Buford F. Gordon, African American civil rights activist, clergyman and social scientist
- Buford A. Johnson, member of the Tuskegee Airmen
- Buford Jordan, professional football player
- Buford Long, professional football player
- Buford McGee, professional football player
- Buford Meredith, American baseball player for the Negro leagues
- Buford Nunley, American baseball player for the Negro leagues
- P. Buford Price, American professor
- Buford Pusser, Tennessee sheriff whose life was made into a series of movies
- Buford Ray, professional football player
- Buford John Schramm, businessman and light helicopter developer

== Fictional characters ==
- Buford, Leo Valdez's walking table in Rick Riordan's Heroes of Olympus series
- Buford, a pink dog from the cartoon show Buford and the Galloping Ghost
- Buford T. Justice, character played by Jackie Gleason in the Smokey and the Bandit films
- Buford Van Stomm, one of the supporting characters on Disney's Phineas and Ferb
- Buford Tannen, the antagonist of Back to the Future Part III
- Buford Wilson (Beef), a mutant character in Marvel Comics

== See also ==
- Buford (surname)
- Bufford
- Burford (surname)
- Buford (disambiguation)
- Bluford (disambiguation)
- Bruford (disambiguation)
