= Burford (surname) =

Burford is a surname. Notable people with the surname include:

- Anne Gorsuch Burford (1942–2004), American lawyer and politician
- Byron Burford (1920–2011), American painter
- Della Burford (born 1946), Canadian artist and writer
- Ephraim John Burford (1905–1997), English historian and writer
- George Burford (born 1875), American soccer coach
- Gordon Burford (1919–2010), Australian model engine designer and manufacturer
- Lolah Burford (died 2002), American writer
- Nathaniel Macon Burford (1824–1898), American politician
- Oliver Burford (born 1980), English cricketer
- Oliver Lambert Alan Burford (1860–1923), officer of the Royal Australian Navy
- Pamela Burford (born 1954), American writer
- Priyanga Burford, British actress and writer
- Robert Burford (painter) (1791–1861), English painter
- Robert F. Burford (1923–1993), American politician
- Roger Burford (1904–1981), English screenwriter
- Seth Burford (born 1979), American football player
- Spencer Burford (born 2000), American football player
- Thomas Burford (died before 1406), MP for Salisbury, England
- Thomas Nelson Burford (1935–2020), American apple historian
- W. H. Burford & Sons, South Australian soap business

== See also ==
- Bufford
- Bluford (disambiguation)
- Bruford (disambiguation)
