= Buford =

Buford may refer to:

== Places ==
=== United States ===
- Buford, Arkansas
- Buford, Colorado, an unincorporated community
- Buford, Georgia
- Buford Dam, infrastructure in Georgia
- Buford Highway community, in Fulton, DeKalb, and Gwinnett Counties in Georgia
- Buford, North Dakota
- Buford, Ohio
- Buford, South Carolina
- Buford, Mitchell County, Texas
- Buford, Virginia
- Buford, Wyoming
- Fort Buford
- Buford Tower in Austin, Texas

=== Canada ===
- Buford, Alberta

== People ==
- Buford (given name)
- Buford (surname)

== Ship ==
- USAT Buford, a ship used to deport aliens from the U.S. in 1919

== Other ==
- Buford v. United States, a 2001 Supreme Court case

== See also ==
- Bruford (disambiguation)
- Burford (disambiguation)
- Bluford (disambiguation)
