= Burford (disambiguation) =

Burford is a town in Oxfordshire, England.

Burford may also refer to:

== Places ==
=== Canada ===
- Burford, Ontario

=== England ===
- Burford, Cheshire, in the civil parish of Acton, Cheshire
- Burford, Devon, in the civil parish of Clovelly
- Burford, Shropshire
- Burford, Somerset

== Other uses ==
- Burford (surname)
- HMS Burford, the name of three ships of the Royal Navy
- Burford Capital, known simply as Burford, a litigation finance company

== See also ==
- Bruford (disambiguation)
- Buford (disambiguation)
- Ford (disambiguation)
