= Louis W. Yemm =

South Australian organist (died 1951)

John William Louis Yemm (died c. 16/01/1951), known as Louis W. Yemm, was an organist in South Australia who had a long association with patriotic causes, notably Cheer-Up Society and their Violet Memory Day.

== History ==
Yemm was born in Berkshire to a musical family, and began studying piano, organ and singing at age nine. At age 13 or 14 he was appointed chorister under Joseph Barnby, precentor of Eton College. He acted as organist and choirmaster for various churches in England before leaving for Australia.

He arrived in South Australia in 1888 and found employment as organist at Christ Church, Kapunda. His first concert, in March 1889, was a light-hearted affair and much enjoyed by the audience.

Yemm moved to Adelaide in 1892, to take a position with Chalmers Church, North Terrace as choirmaster and harmoniumist. He had rooms at Stratford Villa, Pulteney Street, where he took students in piano, organ, and music theory.

In 1896 he succeeded Professor Ives as organist for the North Adelaide Baptist Church. That instrument, a three-manual affair installed by Fincham & Hobday in 1891, was considered one of the best in the colony.

In 1900 he returned to Chalmers Church, where a large new two-manual organ had been built and installed by Josiah E. Dodd. The first sacred concert with this instrument was held in March 1900. He had a considerable clientele of students, by 1913 working from a studio at Marshall's Chambers, 52 Rundle-street.

He proved a capable concert organizer as well as an organist, and had a good reputation as one who gave his services free to charitable and religious events. One remarkable concert was in celebration of the Foreign Bible Society's 50th anniversary, where among other musical duties, Yemm conducted the 300-member choir.

He left Chalmers in March 1910 for St. Laurence's (Dominican Catholic) Church, Buxton Street North Adelaide, where a new organ had recently been installed. He officiated at that organ until 1913, perhaps 1915 or later. Certainly by September 1917 the church was advertising for a replacement.

He gave a series of free Sunday Grand Organ recitals at the Town Hall in conjunction with elocutionist Clement May in July and August 1912 during the absence of W. R. Knox, who instituted the tradition.

From 1915 his public life centred around his and his wife's philanthropic activities. It is likely his sole source of income was private tuition.

== Cheer-Up Society ==
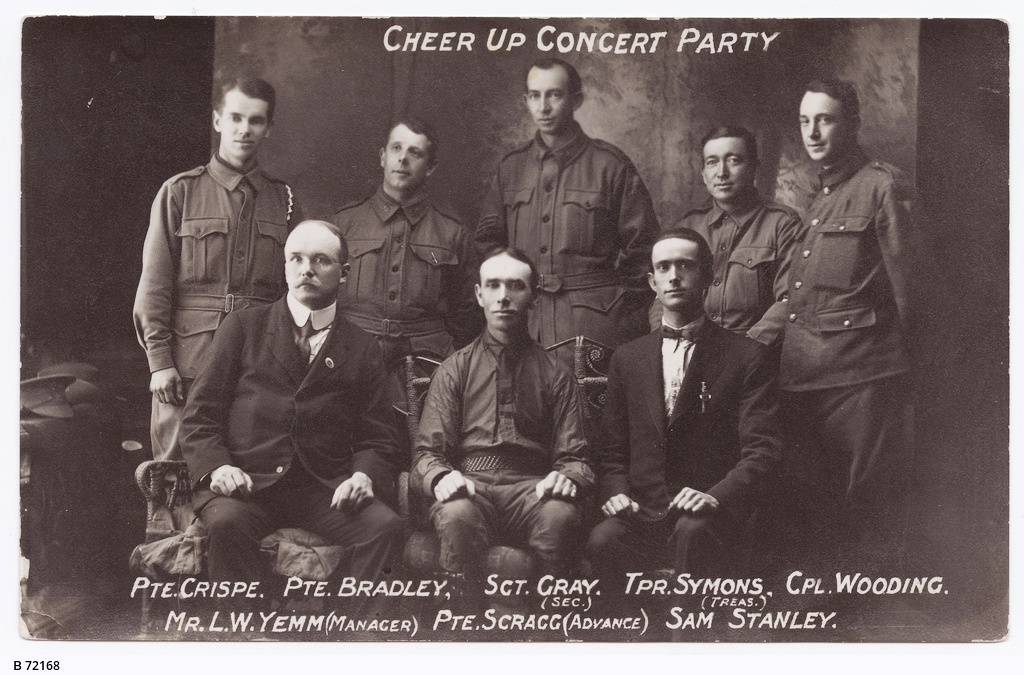
Cheer-Up concert party 1917. Sam Stanley was the stage name of Samuel George Forrester.

Founded in South Australia by Mrs A. Seager, with thousands of members throughout the State, almost all adult women. Their mission was selflessly to provide comforts and encouragement for servicemen in the State, whether departing, on furlough or returned.

Yemm's first encounter with the association may have been through his wife, who was a donor and worker. South Australian troops returning in February 1915 from the capture of German New Guinea received no official welcome, as no-one knew they were coming, but the "Cheer-ups" made up for it with a reception held at their great tent near the Adelaide railway station on 12 March. Musical entertainment was provided by Yemm and some of the top artists of the day: Ethel Ridings, Gladys Cilento, and Professor Charles Sauer.

He was musical director at the Cheer-up farewell on 11 September 1915 to a record 750 reinforcements for the 10th, 12th, 16th, and 27th Battalion and the 3rd, 9th, and 11th Light Horse leaving for the front. A feature of the music program was Yemm and Seager's Our Soldier's Song, whose first public performance was on 14 April 1915.

=== Cheer-up Concert Party ===
Yemm formed a light entertainment group consisting of "Returned Soldiers and Rejects": Tpr. Lionel Symons, tenor, Cpl. Arnold J. Wooding, tenor, Sam Stanley, basso and comedy juggler, Pte. Clem Y. Crisp/e, baritone, Sgt. Fred G. Gray, lecturer and secretary, Pte. George H. Bradley, Pte. Percy Scragg, advance agent and publicist, and Louis W. Yemm, piano, musical director, which toured country towns in 1917:

- 2–4 July: Port Pirie, Petersburg
- 4–13 August: Edithburgh, Warooka, Stansbury, Yorketown, Minlaton, Port Vincent, Curramulka, Maitland, Port Victoria. Concerts were accompanied by a lecture on the Society by Sgt F. G. Gray, who doubled as the group's secretary.
- 24–31 August Cowell and area (inc. Salt Creek and Elbow Hill), then a return engagement on 20 October.
- 17–21 September Collie, Calca, Streaky Bay, Murat Bay, Charra. By this time the party was reduced to five members (Crispe, Stanley, Symons, Wooding, Yemm) due to illness, but were well received.
- 4 October Streaky Bay, for an evening performance in conjunction with the Agricultural Society's Show.
- December Milang, Port Elliot, Keith, Bordertown, Mundalla, and Wolseley. By this time only four of Yemm's original troupe remained; additions were "Zisco", a stage magician; and Harry Douglas, singer, dancer and trick cyclist.

Barely a week went by that Yemm was not playing piano or organ at some patriotic function, usually Cheer-ups, and was directing three or four major entertainments a year until 1920 when the last contingent of South Australian soldiers returned home.

=== Violet Memory Day ===
Violet Day was introduced by Mrs Seager as a day of remembrance and a fund-raiser for the Cheer-up Hut, when citizens were encouraged to wear a violet in a buttonhole or under a brooch. Cheer-Up Society volunteers met every tram, bus and train, offering blooms and badges for sale. Always held on a Friday, Adelaide's traditional "Button Day", Violet Days were held on 2 July 1915; 25 August 1916; 29 June 1917; 21 June 1918; 20 June 1919 and 9 July 1920. The Cheer-Up Society held its last General Meeting shortly after and went into recess. In 1921 a large number of patriotic organisations combined to continue the event as the "Violet Memory Day", generally held on the nearest Sunday to 4 August, anniversary of Britain's (and therefore Australia's) declaration of war.

W. J. Sowden was elected president of the new organisation and F. J. Mills hon. secretary, so the old Cheer-Up Society retained a presence. The sale of flowers and buttons was dropped in favour of memorial services, of which Yemm is reported as being involved in each of the first 26. By including the Violet Day services 1915–1920, Violet Memory Day was reckoned Australia's longest continuous running annual war memorial service. From 1921 to 1926 the services were held at the Jubilee Exhibition Building and henceforward at the Adelaide Town Hall. Dates of services were:

31 July 1921; 30 July 1922; 29 July 1923; 13 August 1924; 9 August 1925; 1 August 1926; 7 August 1927; 12 August 1928; 4 August 1929; 27 July 1930; 2 August 1931; 7 August 1932; 7 August 1933; 6 August 1934; 4 August 1935; 2 August 1936; 1 August 1937; 7 August 1938; 20 August 1939; 4 August 1940; 1 August 1941; 2 August 1942; 8 August 1943; 6 August 1944; 5 August 1945; 26 August 1946 (postponed due to public transport strike); 3 August 1947; 1 August 1948; 7 August 1949; 6 August 1950; 12 August 1951; 3 August 1952; 2 August 1953; years 1954 onward yet to find.

W. R. Knox gave organ recitals 2.30–3.00 pm (before the service) in 1927, 1928, 1929, 1930 and 1931. L. W. Yemm performed the same service in 1937, 1938, 1939 and 1940.

== Compositions ==
- Composed music for Mrs A. Seager's lyrics Our Soldier's Song
- A setting for Rudyard Kipling's Recessional in 1927.

== Family ==
Yemm married Marion Olive Beach (1873 – 6 December 1944), daughter of Frederick Dewe Beach (died 14 November 1895) and Elizabeth Way (died 7 May 1903), eldest daughter of James Way, at Chalmers Church on 19 December 1900. They had no children.
