= Buford (surname) =

Buford is a surname. Notable people with the surname include:

- Abraham Buford (1747–1833), commanding officer during the "Waxhaw Massacre"
- Abraham Buford II (1820–1884), Confederate general during the American Civil War
- Algernon Sidney Buford (1826–1911), American colonel and president of the Richmond and Danville Railroad
- Bill Buford (born 1954), American journalist
- Carter M. Buford (1876–1959), American politician from the state of Missouri
- Don Buford (born 1937), American major league baseball player
- Edward P. Buford (1865-1931), Virginia lawyer and politician
- George "Mojo" Buford (1929–2011), American blues harmonica player
- Jade Buford (born 1988), American racing driver
- Joe Buford (born 1967), American stock car driver
- John Buford (1826–1863), U.S. general during the American Civil War
- Mark Buford (born 1970), American basketball player
- Napoleon Bonaparte Buford (1807–1883), U.S. general during the American Civil War
- R. C. Buford (born 1960), general manager of an NBA basketball franchise

== See also ==
- Bufford
- Burford (surname)
- Bluford (disambiguation)
- Bruford (disambiguation)
