= Patricia Ryan (author) =

American novelist

Patricia Burford Ryan
- Born: August 9, 1954 (age 72); Las Cruces, New Mexico, U.S.
- Occupation: Novelist
- Writing career
- Pen name: Patricia Ryan; P.B. Ryan
- Period: 1995–present
- Genres: Romance, Mystery
- Website: www.pb-ryan.com

Patricia Burford Ryan (born August 9, 1954, in Las Cruces, New Mexico, United States) is an American writer of romance novels as Patricia Ryan and mystery novels as P.B. Ryan. She is the twin sister of the romance writer Pamela Burford.

She won a Golden Heart award in 1994 in the category "short contemporary series" and two Romantic Times Reviewers’ Choice Awards. Her book Silken Threads also won a RITA, the top award of the Romance Writers of America, for "Best Long Historical Romance" of 2000.

== Biography ==
=== Personal life ===
Patricia Burford and her twin Pamela Burford were born on August 9, 1954, in Las Cruces, New Mexico, United States. Patricia formerly worked in the publishing industry in New York City and Rochester, NY, as both a marketing manager and editor. She lives in Austin, Texas with her husband Richard. Together they have two daughters, Morgan and Leigh.

=== Writing career ===
As Patricia Ryan, she wrote seventeen romances, both contemporary and historical. Under this name, she won a Golden Heart award in 1994 in the category "short contemporary series" and two Romantic Times Reviewers’ Choice Awards. Her book Silken Threads also won a RITA, the top award of the Romance Writers of America, for "Best Long Historical Romance" of 2000.

As P.B. Ryan, she created the Nell Sweeney historical mystery series. The series is set in post-Civil War Boston (19th century). Murder in a Mill Town was nominated for the Mary Higgins Clark Award.

Patricia Burford Ryan's novels have been critically acclaimed and published in over twenty countries.

== Bibliography ==
=== As Patricia Ryan ===
==== Single novels ====
- The Return of the Black Sheep, 1995/05
- A Burning touch, 1996/01
- For the Thrill of It!, 1996/09
- Twice the Spice, 1997/04
- In Hot Pursuit, 1998/10
- All of Me, 2000/01
- Million Dollar Baby, 2000/11

==== Fairfax Family Saga Series ====
1. Falcon's Fire, 1995/12
2. Heaven's Fire, 1996/10

==== Périgueux Family Saga Series ====
1. Secret Thunder, 1997/05
2. Wild Wind, 1998/02

==== Wexford Family Saga Series ====
1. Silken Threads, 1999/06
2. The Sun and the Moon, 2000/06

==== Anthologies in collaboration ====
- "August" in SUMMER HEAT, 1998/08 (with Pamela Burford)
- "Santa, baby" in NAUGHTY OF NICE?, 2001/11 (with Sherrilyn Kenyon and Carly Phillips and Kathryn Smith)
- "Possessing Julia" in BURNING UP, 2003/07 (with Nina Bangs, Cheryl Holt and Kimberly Raye)
- "What happens in Vegas" in TAKING CARE OF BUSINESS, 2005/08 (with Toni Blake and LuAnn McLane)

=== As P.B. Ryan ===
==== Nell Sweeney Historical Mystery Series ====
1. Still Life with Murder, 2003/07
2. Murder in a Mill Town, 2004/07
3. Death on Beacon Hill, 2005/03
4. Murder on Black Friday, 2005/11
5. Murder in the North End, 2006/11
6. A Bucket of Ashes, 2007/12
