= W. R. Knox =

South Australian organist (1861–1933)

William Robert Knox (21 July 1861 – 7 September 1933), generally known as W. R. Knox, was an organist in Adelaide, South Australia.

== History ==
Knox was born in Adelaide, the eldest son of John Knox, jun, ( – 27 October 1908) and his wife Eliza Annie Nairn Knox, née Morton ( – 7 December 1915) of "Kirkwall", William Street, Norwood.

He was a student of fellow Australian composer Paolo Giorza

He was a visiting teacher of piano at Prince Alfred College . One who profited from his instruction was the (later) Lord Mayor C. R. J. Glover.

He succeeded T. H. Jones as organist for the Brougham Place Congregational Church, serving from 1902 to 1919, when he was followed by Frederick Bevan, then George Griffiths in 1931.

He began in 1912 the tradition of free Sunday morning organ recitals at the Adelaide Town Hall. Louis Yemm deputised for him in July and August 1912.

Knox followed T. H. Jones as City Organist in 1923 and served until 1928. The appointment of his successor was attended by controversy: John Dempster was appointed without any competitive evaluation, and eminent musicians John Horner, Frederic Finlay and W. Lawrence Haggitt, who had all applied, signed a public letter airing their sense of injustice, clearly implying he was a poor choice. Knox refrained from comment.

He died after a short illness and his remains were interred in the West Terrace Cemetery.

An obituary photograph of Knox was published wearing starched collar and magnificent whiskers.

== Family ==
William Robert Knox (1861–1933) married Adelle Martha Goss ( – 7 January 1936) on 10 April 1884. Their family included:

- Gladys Irene Stella Knox (1891–1916)
- Keith Morton Knox (1893–1962) married Florence Ellinor Woodcock ( –1997) on 14 February 1925
- Doreen Constance Knox (1899–1990) married Leo James Pyne (1900–1979) on 5 September 1925
- Victor Tennyson Knox (1901–1963) married Ruth Bowen Chinner (1903–1948) on 2 September 1930. Ruth was a daughter of Walter E. Chinner.
- Elsa Beatrice Knox (1902–1997)
- Alwyn Lewis Gordon Knox (1903–1924)
- Inez Christabel Knox (1905–2004)

They had a home on Magill Road, Tranmere

His sister Ada Knox (1875–1963) was a well-known singer who was frequently accompanied by her brother on piano. She married Edgar Charles Thurston on 14 September 1912.

His uncle, Nathaniel Alexander Knox (1837 – 6 March 1908) was a partner in the legal firm Knox, Gwynne and Hargrave with E C Gwynne (c. 1848 – 19 August 1905) and C T Hargrave (1855 – 9 September 1924). He founded the suburb Knoxville (now subsumed in the suburbs of Glenside and Glenunga).
