= Harold Wylde =

Australian organist

Harold Eustace Wylde FRCO, ARCM, LRAM (1888–1975) was a South Australian organist.

== History ==
Wylde was born in South Australia, a son of Rundle Street draper Charles Wylde. and grew up in the suburb of Glenelg. He studied organ under Walter B. Hills, organist of St. Peter's Church, Glenelg, then in England under D. J. Bennett, organist of Lincoln Cathedral. He was admitted a Fellow of the Royal College of Organists in 1908. He also studied pianoforte under Gertrude Foster and in 1909 he was elected an Associate of the Royal College of Music. In 1910 he was appointed organist and choirmaster at St. Luke's Church, Bromley, then in 1914 transferred to the Church of St. Nicholas, Guildford. He continued his studies under Sir Walter Parratt for organ, Dr. Charles Wood for composition, and F. A. Sewell for piano accompaniment.

In 1915 he returned to Adelaide to take up an appointment with the University of Adelaide as a tutor at the Elder Conservatorium, a position he held for ten years, relinquishing the appointment to make an extended trip to England, during which time he was accepted into the Church of England. On his return to Adelaide he gave his first concert at the Tynte Street Baptist Church in 1916, with his brother Charles Eric Wylde (1890–1972) as vocalist. He gave concerts in other churches that year: the Methodist Church on Young Street, Parkside and Clayton Congregational Church, Kensington. In 1917 he was appointed to St. Andrew's Church, Walkerville, but a year later accepted an offer from the Stow Memorial Church, Flinders Street.

Wylde was chosen to open in November 1917 the new organ at St. Raphael's (Catholic) church, Parkside, and over the years gave several concerts of sacred music in that church, and assisted with the choir. In 1930 he was appointed choirmaster to St. Raphael's. He also served as occasional organist at St Francis Xavier's Cathedral, and in 1931 began taking choral classes for girls at the cathedral. In 1932 he was appointed conductor of the cathedral choir. In 1946 he retired as organist and choirmaster at the cathedral, to be replaced by James Coburn Govenlock Mus.Bac., LRSM (1915–1984), Wylde's pupil from the age of 14.

He was engaged by the Adelaide Orpheus Society as accompanist in 1916, a connection he retained until 1923, when Frederic Finlay, once his student as well as of J. M. Dunn and John Horner.

His involvement with the Adelaide Town Hall began with a couple of concerts in August 1917. In 1932 he was appointed City Organist, a position he retained for 34 years. J. V. Peters succeeded him in 1966.

== Compositions ==
Wylde, Harold 1888–1975. Poem for Josephine; Wylde, Harold, 1888–1975. Dance on the black notes for Annette; Wylde, Harold, 1888–1975. Lullaby for Phillida, Three organ pieces named for the composer's nieces, [between 1900 and 1975]
