= Cheer-Up Society =

WWI servicemen's welfare organization in South Australia

The Cheer-Up Society (Note: Orthography in this article follows that of The Australian National Dictionary, but is not definitive. The use of a lower-case "U", also without a hyphen were common variants of the society's name. The Macquarie Dictionary avoids the subject altogether.) was a South Australian patriotic organisation founded during The Great War, whose aims were provision of creature comforts for soldiers in South Australia. Much of their activity was centred on the Cheer-up Hut, which they built behind the Adelaide railway station, and almost entirely staffed and organised by volunteers.

It is sufficient to know that we are all doing something to give pleasure and comfort to the brave soldiers who are going from Australia to fight for King and Empire; and that we hope to receive them on their return in this Cheer-up Hut of theirs – for it belongs to the soldiers and not to the members of the Cheer-up Society – where they will enjoy the comforts and rest of home. Nothing we can do is too good for these heroic soldiers of ours. The sphere of work of the society is kept within definite and specific limits, which do not overlap in the slightest the splendid patriotic work which is being carried out successfully by the S.A. Soldiers' Fund, the Red Cross, the Wattle Day League, the Y.M.C.A., the S.O.S., the Belgian Fund, and other like organizations. The desire of the members of the Cheer-up Society is to co-operate in the most amicable manner with all such societies.

The organization was revived on a professional basis during the Second World War.

== History ==
Following an editorial in The Register lamenting the lack of public support for the SA members of the AIF 2nd Contingent who were about to be posted overseas, Mrs A. Seager organised a "Cheer Up Our Boys" luncheon at Montefiore Hill, staffed by women volunteers, for the 1,100 soldiers who were completing their training at the Morphettville camp.

This was followed by a Christmas dinner at the new Oaklands camp, and Sunday teas every week through January.

The "Cheer-Up Society" emerged a few weeks later. It initially consisted of Stella M. Baker (president) and Mrs Seager (hon. secretary) and their network of volunteers, but with members of the public clamoring to join, and with money and goods beginning to arrive, it was necessary to put the organization on a firm footing. In February Mrs Baker resigned as president and William John Sowden, editor of The Register and a man well known as a charity organiser, was elected to the post. Mrs. George Aldridge and Misses E. S. Abbott and Winifred Scott have been named as early executives.

Sometime shortly after, Sowden appointed an (effectively all-male) interim committee (see table). Sir John Gordon, at a subsequent General Meeting protested the lack of women on the Board of Management. If there were no ladies in the movement, he said, there would be no Cheer-up Society, and he was prepared to join in a revolution next year to have a few of those energetic workers on the board. No revolution occurred and the board elected in 1917 had four extra, male, members.

After completion of the Cheer-up Hut (see below), Mrs. Seager was appointed a salaried officer of the society, as manager of the Cheer-up Hut, in addition to the office of Organizer, so that her undivided attention could be given to the affairs of the society. The Cheer-up Hut became the office of the society.

By December 1915, there were over 300 members in Adelaide and over 10,000 members in 86 branches in the country and suburbs (Glenelg and Semaphore being prominent). Semaphore branch (the only branch composed solely of women) welcomed troops arriving at the Outer Harbor; the Alberton branch devoted itself to the camp at Cheltenham. The most active country branches were in 1916 named as Aldinga, Angaston, Ardrossan, Balaklava, Blyth, Burra, Bute, Crystal Brook, Freeling, Gawler, Jamestown, Kadina, Lameroo, Laura, McLaren Flat, Marrabel, Morgan, Mount Gambier, Murray Bridge (who provided refreshments to soldiers on trains, no matter what the hour), Narracoorte, Nuriootpa, Orroroo, Petersburg, Port Augusta, Port Elliot, Port Pirie, Robertstown, Strathalbyn, Tallunda Flat, Tanunda, Tumby Bay, Victor Harbor, Wallaroo, Willson's River (Kangaroo Island) and Willunga. Many were not affiliated with Cheer-Up Society, Incorporated, and were not under its rule.

Funds were raised from a multitude of sources, from donations and "button day" collections (Cheer-up and Violet days), events like "Egyptian Fair" and "Dickens Fair" and travelling concerts organised by Louis W. Yemm. The books and accounts of the society were scrutinized by two auditors, and half yearly balance sheets and full financial statements submitted to the executive committee and to the annual general meeting. The Society was incorporated around August 1915.

Other activities include

- providing books to South Australian soldiers in military hospitals in the Mediterranean region.
- Large delegations assembled at the railway station or port to farewell departing troops and welcome those returning on furlough. Flags were presented to departing troops by members such as Mrs. W. F. Stock, Mrs. L. G. Stock, Mrs. A. G. Wilkinson, Mrs. A. G. Rymill, Mrs. William Campbell and Mr. W. B. Wilkinson.
- The Cheer-Up Society helped the Red Cross Society in its Naval, Military, and Red Cross Exhibition on 5 October 5, 1916.
- Donation to HMAS Torrens of an Australian flag; it was flown at the head of the Dardanelles convoy on the signing of the armistice with Turkey.
- Nurses of the Voluntary Aid Detachment who visited Adelaide with returning wounded soldiers were met, entertained and provided with transport.
- The Cheer-up Hut became a "home from home" for country soldiers, invalid and wounded soldiers, and was host to many reunions.

Board of management, Cheer-Up Society
	February? 1915	December 1915	December 1916	December 1917	December 1918	December 1919
President	W. J. Sowden	———do———	———do———	———do———	———do———	———do———
Organizer / Gen. Sec	Mrs A. Seager	———do———	———do———	———do———	———do———	———do———
Board Secretary	James W. Jones	———do———	———do———	———do———	———do———	———do———
Treasurer	Edward V. Clark	Gordon E. Sunter	Edward I. Lloyd	———do———	E. B. Grandfield	———do———
Ass. Treasurer				Mrs Hay		
Vice-President	F. J. Mills	———do———	———do———	———do———	———do———	———do———
Vice-President	George McEwin	———do———	———do———	———do———	———do———	———do———
Vice-President			N. W. L. Eddington	———do———	———do———	———do———
Board member	A. H. Sandford	———do———	Capt. Coyle	Hon. H. Peake	———do———	A. G. Tender
Board member	Benjamin Benny	———do———	———do———	———do———	———do———	———do———
Board member	G. A. W. Alexander	N. W. L. Eddington	A. G. Rymill	C. R. J. Glover	———do———	
Board member	Louis W. Yemm	———do———	———do———	Stanley Price Weir	———do———	———do———
Board member	Crawford Vaughan	———do———	———do———	———do———		
Board member	C. E. Owen Smyth	———do———	———do———	———do———	———do———	
Board member	H. J. Henderson	———do———	———do———	———do———	———do———	
Board member			J. Lancelot Stirling	———do———	———do———	
Board member			Cmdr O. L. A. Burford, R.A.N.	———do———	Capt. C. J. Clare R.A.N.	———do———
Board member			Brig.-Gen. Irving	Brig. Gen Forsyth	Brig. Gen. Antill	———do———
Board member			Isaac Isaacs	———do———	———do———	
Board member				J. Q. Bruce	———do———	
Board member				W. A. Duncan	———do———	
Board member				Sir John Gordon	———do———	
Board member				A. G. Fenner	———do———	
Board member					Edward I. Lloyd	
Board member					E. V. H. Martin	
Board member					Major W. L. Stuart	
Board member					Alex McCulloch	
Auditor		W. N. Twiss		Gordon Sunter	———do———	
Auditor		A. R. S. Craig		———do———	———do———	

Significant General Meetings

- 1st Annual General Meeting
- 2nd Annual Meeting
- 3rd Annual Meeting
- 4th Annual Meeting
- 5th (and last) Annual Meeting
- Reception for Gen. Birdwood
- Half-yearly meeting

== Cheer-up Hut ==
approximate locations only
1 Cheer-up Hut 1915–1925
2 Memorial Arch 1919–1925
3 Adelaide City Baths (Olympic pool)
4 Govt. Printing Office, Govt. Printer
Station Road which ran alongside the railway station (now Casino) once curved right and emerged at King William Road between these two Government-owned businesses.

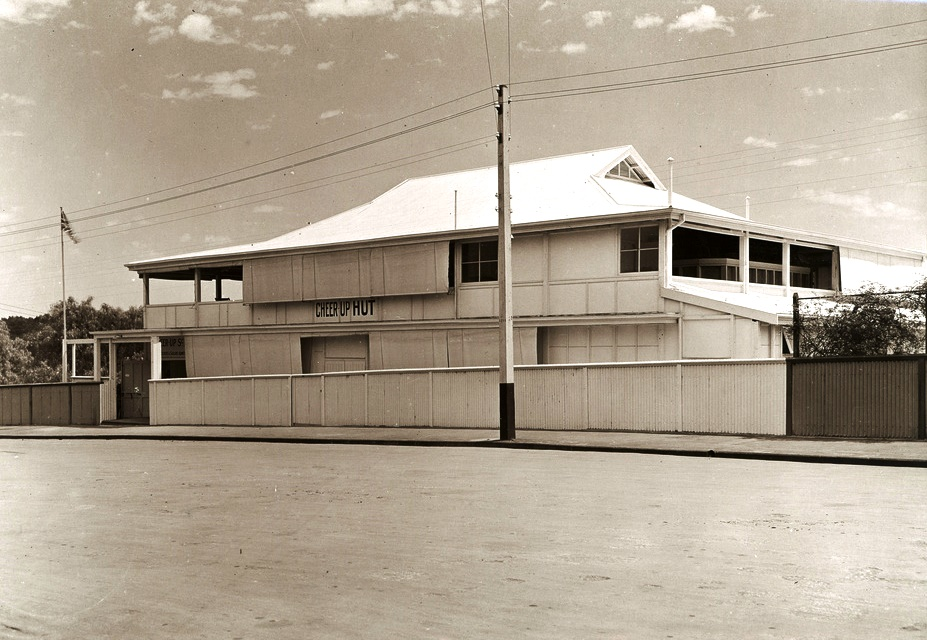
Cheer-up hut c. 1919. The road emerged (further right) at King William Road between the City Baths and Govt. Printer.

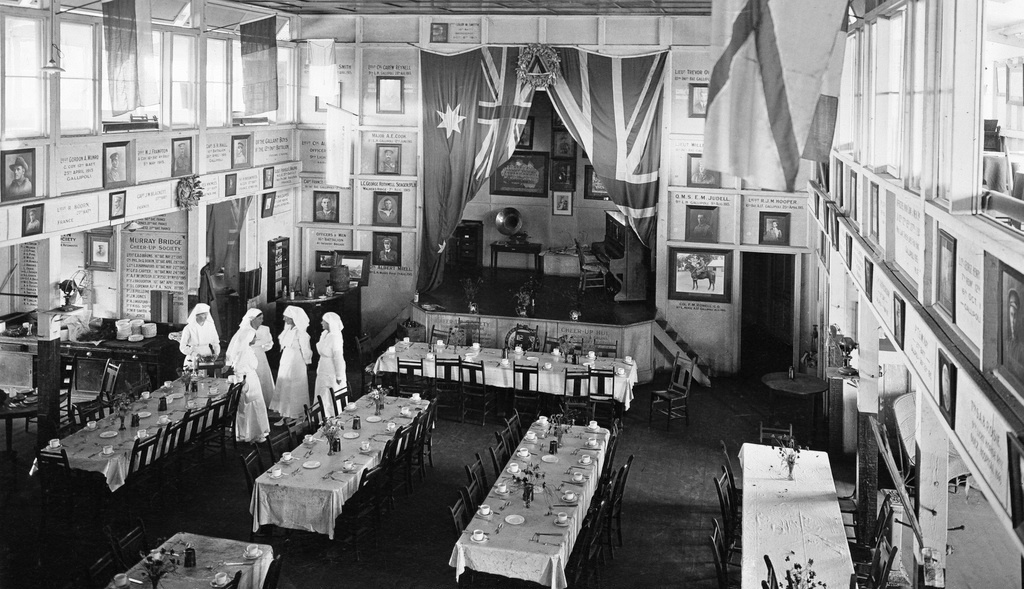
Burra Hall

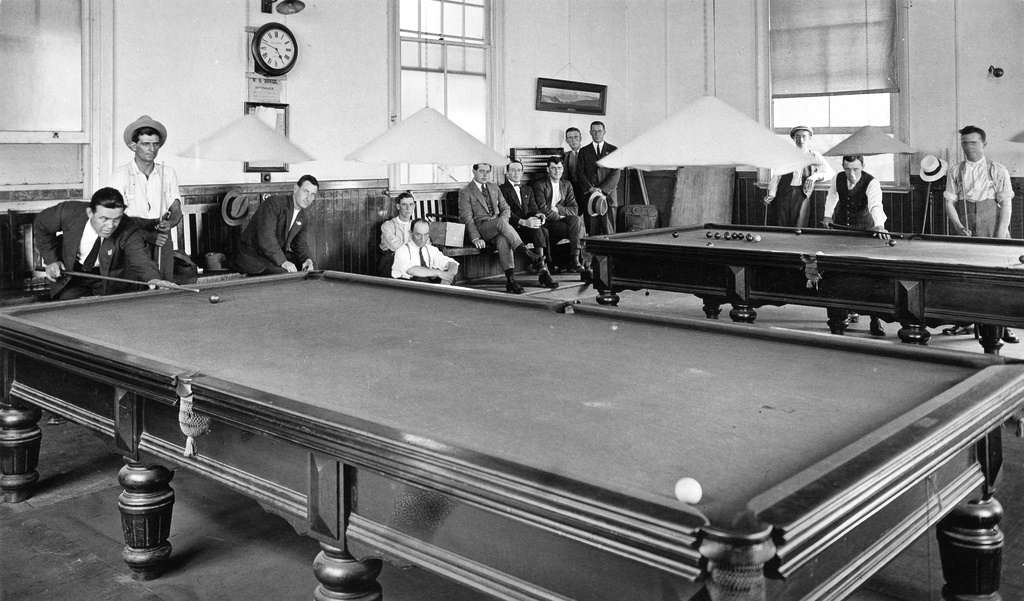
Billiard room

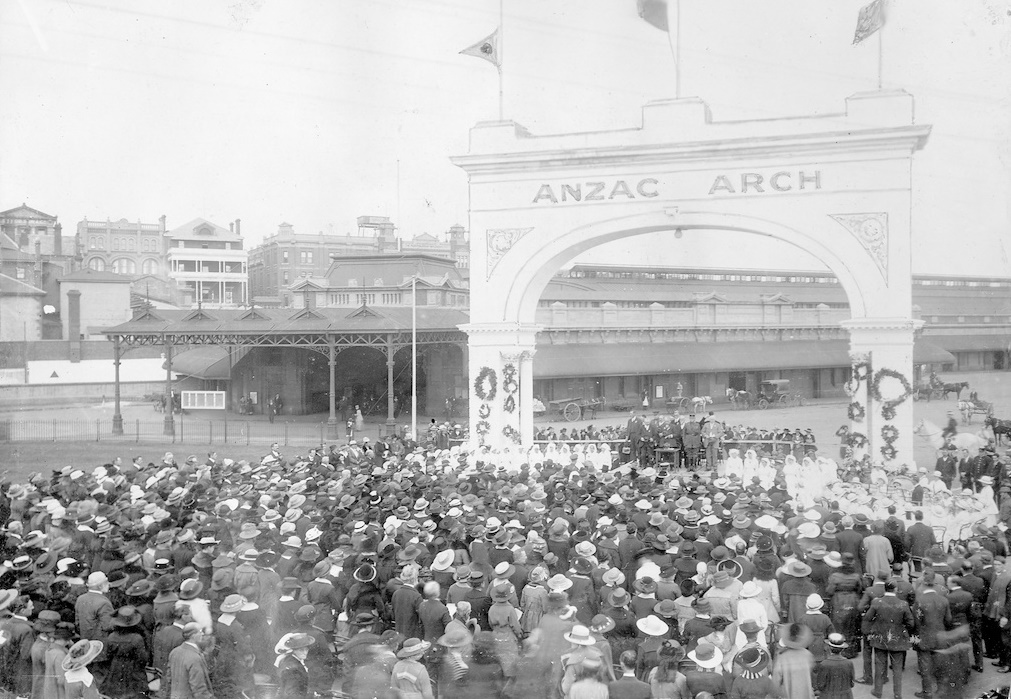
Crowd at Anzac Arch 1919. "Cheer-up Ladies" in white uniforms

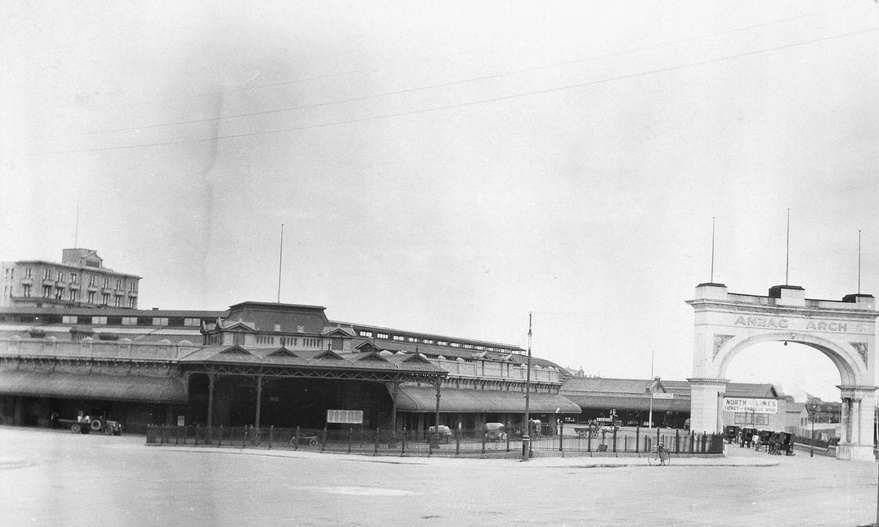
Anzac Arch; Railway yards and North Tce. in background

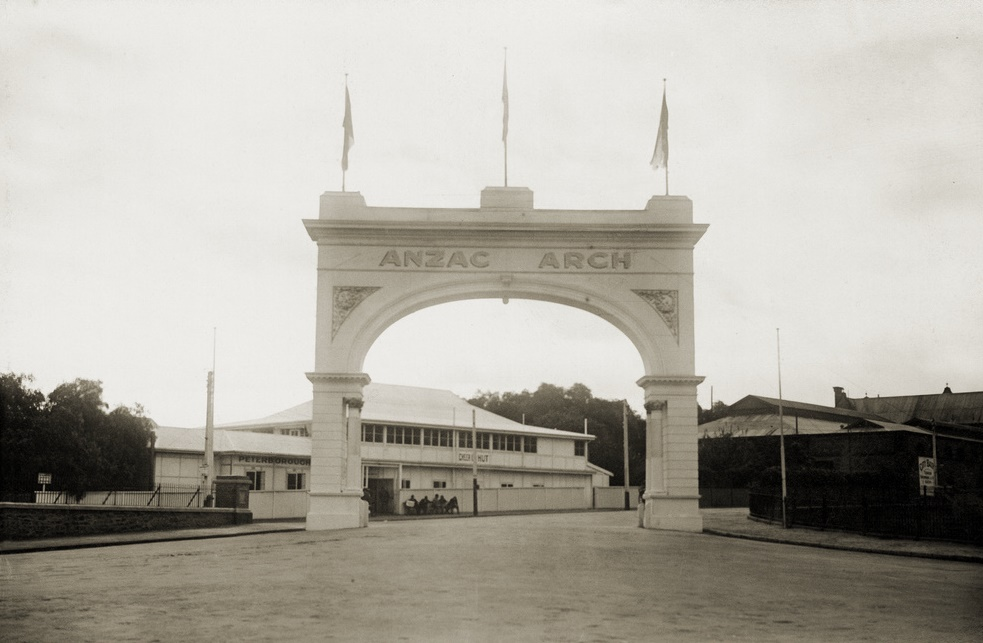
Anzac Arch framing Cheer-up hut c. 1920

The first "hut", erected around April 1915, was a borrowed tent behind the City Baths, with the permission of its lessee/manager, Charles Bastard. They then moved to rented premises in Bentham Street, but soon found that it was too small, and a purpose-built structure was the only way forward. The Railways department offered a plot of land behind the railway buildings and close to the City Baths at nominal rent as long as the land wasn't needed for railway business. The design, by H. J. Henderson, was little more than a model, but on that basis Henry Slade and his team finished the job under budget and in time for the Official Opening on 4 November 1915, the first anniversary of the society. The site was ideal, with an outlook over Torrens Lake, the Rotunda, Creswell Gardens, and North Adelaide. Much of its cost was met by country branches of the Society, notably Burra, which contributed £761, in recognition of which the main hall of the Cheer-up Hut was named "The Burra Hall".

- The hut was very popular with soldiers and sailors, who used it for writing, reading, and billiards, and they generally had midday or evening meals, for which they pay 6d. Tea and cake was served for 3d. on afternoons and evenings. The hut takings for meals to soldiers in 1917 was £1,184, representing about 60,000 meals.
- The billiard room adjoining the hut was officially opened by Brig.-Gen. Irving on Saturday, 18 November 1916. H. J. Henderson was responsible for its design, oversight and collected a large part of the funds for its construction and purchase of two first-class billiard tables. Builder H. Slade gave very generous help in supervising the work, and also contributed towards its cost.
- The first anniversary of the Cheer-up Hut was celebrated on 18 November by holding a well-attended café chantant in the grounds adjoining the hut.
- The Petersburg Wing and rest room was completed and opened on 12 September 1917, sponsored by the Petersburg Cheer-Up Society.

The history of the Hut henceforth takes two paths, which can only be reconciled by assuming two separate buildings:

1 Removal

- In 1921/1922 the Hut was moved in sections to Barmera, where it was reassembled as the Lady Weigall Hospital (named for the wife of the Governor) to serve the newly established soldier settlement in the area. This was a considerable logistical exercise, involving transport by river barge to Cobdogla, the closest port on the River Murray. The building on its new site may be seen here.

2 Repurposing

- In 1924 the Hut was sold to the Railways and became the Railways Institute hall. It was in 1925 the venue for a farewell concert by Laurence Power on the eve of his departure for Milan. Power was, until that year, a Railways employee.

The title "Cheer-up Hut" continued to be used informally for the re-purposed building, and with the Great Depression was used to provide hot meals to unemployed ex-servicemen, organised by the redoubtable Mrs A. Seager.

- The Cheer-up Hut was still standing in 1938 but considered an eyesore, though historically interesting.

== Anzac Arch ==
Another initiative of Mrs Seager, the Arch straddled Station Road, a private thoroughfare serving the Railway Station, which passed the Cheer-up Hut before emerging at King William Road. Built at a cost of £1,000, construction of the Arch began in October 1918, and was officially opened 29 January 1919. Believed to be the first such structure erected in Australia in recognition of the Anzac forces, it was demolished June 1925 after Railways Department declared it unsafe. During its few years of existence many tens of thousands of servicemen passed through its portal.

== Returned Soldiers' Association ==
A Returned Soldiers Association was formed in 1909 for the benefit of veterans of the Boer War. The organization, later titled S.A.R.S.A., had little public support and vanished.

In October 1915 at the instance of W. J. Sowden a new organization of the same name was founded to serve the interests of servicemen returning from Europe and the Near East. The President and two Vice-Presidents (Sowden, Seager and McEwin) were well known for their work with the Cheer-ups, and a mutually beneficial relationship was expected. A magazine was inaugurated around March 1916 and seven issues were published in that year, largely the work of Cheer-up volunteers, and for much of its early history edited by F. J. Mills in his spare time. Monthly circulation was over 2,000 copies in 1917, and on occasion as many as 5,000 were sold. In January 1918 Donald Kerr MM LLB succeeded Mills as editor. From August 1918 the magazine was subtitled "Official organ of the Returned Sailors and Soldiers' Imperial League of Australia, South Australian Branch". Most copies of volumes 3 and 4 (1918 and 1919) of the magazine may be viewed here.

== Violet Day ==
Another innovation by Mrs. Seager, Violet Days were intended as an opportunity to remember the war dead, and as a fund-raising mechanism for the Cheer-up Hut. Citizens were encouraged to wear a violet in a buttonhole or under a brooch, and businesses to have some kind of display in purple and white. Cheer-Up Society volunteers would throng the city, meeting every tram, bus and train, offering for sale bunches of the flower and souvenir badges. Always held on a Friday, Adelaide's traditional "Button Day", Violet Days were held on 2 July 1915, 25 August 1916, 29 June 1917, 21 June 1918, 20 June 1919 and 9 July 1920. From 1921 the organisation of the occasion was shared by a large number of patriotic organisations and renamed "Violet Memory Day". W. J. Sowden was elected president of the new organisation and F. J. Mills hon. secretary, so the Cheer-up team remained to the fore. The sale of flowers and buttons was dropped in favour of memorial services variously held at the Jubilee Exhibition Building or the Adelaide Town Hall.

Violet Memory Day has long since been dropped as an act of remembrance in favour of Armistice Day, observed throughout Australia on 11 November, with a traditional minute's silence at 11 am (local time). The floral emblem of Armistice Day, also of Anzac Day, is the Flanders poppy.

== Personnel ==
Notes on some workers, for many of whom no Wikipedia article exists:

- George Albert Warburton Alexander, sharebroker died 17 June 1916
- John Quinton Bruce (1865–1930)
- Oliver Lambert Allan Burford (Cmdr. Burford)
- Edward V. Clark (Hon. Treasurer, enlisted 1916)
- William Andrew Duncan ( –1933) grazier, retired to Glenelg
- Norman McDonald Lockhart Eddington (–1930)
- Arthur Gates Fenner (c. 1871–1953) wool expert
- Ernest Barnet Grandfield (1876–1950) insurance executive killed by train near Alberton
- H. J. Henderson, secretary, Adelaide Club d. 22 May 1927
- James William Jones, I.S.O.
- Edward Ivan Lloyd
- Eric Vivian Holland Martin (died 22 August 1919) vice-president R.S.S.I.L.(S.A. branch), suicide by gunshot after suffering chronic ill-health.
- Alex McCulloch (c. 1847 – 11 December 1931) pastoralist at Burra.
- George McEwin.
- Lily Mabel Miell, widow of Lt-Col. Albert Miell, first CO of the 9th Light Horse
- Mrs. A. G. Miller, noted for her work at Bedford Park (tuberculosis) Hospital, which continued after the Cheer-Up-Society had disbanded.
- F. J. Mills
- Col. A. H. Sandford,
- C. E. Owen Smyth, I.S.O.,
- Mrs. W F. Stock, widow of William Frederick Stock ( died 1917).
- Walter Leslie Stuart (c. 1875 – 12 August 1933) was Master of the Supreme Court, struck of roll for larceny of Commonwealth Bonds, died insolvent in Northfield Consumptive Home.
- Gordon Edward Sunter (1882–1973) alderman of Adelaide City Council
- Mrs G. A. J. Webb
- Louis W. Yemm, organist, died January 1951. Long association with Violet Memory Day and Cheer-up Concert Party, who in 1917 made extensive tours throughout the State.

== Honour Roll ==
A large honour roll, designed by Miss Blanche Francis in Australian blackwood, on which the names of all the women workers were inscribed, hung in the Cheer-up Hut.
