= John Horner (organist) =

Scottish organist, choirmaster and music teacher

John Adam Horner OBE FRCO LRAM (18 October 1899 – 10 October 1973) was a Scottish organist, choirmaster and music teacher in South Australia.

== History ==
Horner was born at Stepps, Lanarkshire, son of William Horner, commercial clerk, and Jeanie Pollack, née Adam. He received his education mainly in northern England and began to study accountancy. At the age of 16 he was organist at St Andrew's Episcopal Church, Milngavie, Dunbartonshire. He studied piano under Agnes Millar, and organ under John Pullein, Dr. Stanley Marchant, of St. Paul's Cathedral, and Prof. Joseph Cox Bridge of Durham University.

During the Great War he joined the Royal Flying Corps in 1917 and served with the Royal Air Force in Italy, after which he studied for his LRAM.

Horner was a teacher of organ and pianoforte at the Glasgow Athenaeum School of Music, organist with the Scottish Orchestra Company, and instructor of the Glasgow University orchestral society and Glasgow Amateur Orchestral Society. He was organist and choirmaster at Woodlands Church, Glasgow, and assisted at St. Mary's Cathedral, Glasgow.

Horner was appointed to the academic staff of the University of Adelaide's Elder Conservatorium in 1927 as a replacement for Harold Wylde, who retired in 1925. He arrived in South Australia aboard Cathay in February 1928.

He was one of those (with Frederic Finlay and W. Lawrence Haggitt, W. R. Knox abstaining) who protested the appointment of John Dempster as City Organist in 1929 without due process. (Harold Wylde succeeded him in 1933) Similar controversies had arisen between W. R. Pybus and T. H. Jones in 1891.

He served as part-time organist and choirmaster with

- St Peter's, Glenelg from December 1929
- St Augustine's, Unley from January 1932
- Stow Memorial Church, Adelaide from 1936 or earlier to 1948, succeeding James Shakespeare.

He gave regular organ recitals which earned for him a reputation as one of the finest organists in Australia.

He helped found the Lydian Singers in 1935 and the Stow Music Club.

He was a member of the Savage Club.

He later served as music critic for The Advertiser and music adviser to the Adelaide Festival of Arts

He was appointed State president of the Australian Arts Council and South Australian ambassador to the UNESCO conference which founded the Australian Society for Music Education. Horner became acting Director of the Conservatorium in 1964 and retired in 1966.

== Recognition ==
Horner was invested OBE in June 1970.

== Family ==
John Horner married Marjorie Laura Ball ( –1977) on 10 December 1928. They had one son. Marjorie was a fine pianist.
