= Bufford =

Bufford is a surname. Notable people with the name include:

- Charles Lee Bufford (born 1953–54), American man cleared of murder
- Jamall Bufford, American rapper known as "Buff1"
- John Henry Bufford (1810–1870), American lithographer
- Joseph Henry Bufford (c.1854-1923), American state legislator

== See also ==
- Buford (surname)
- Burford (surname)
- Bluford (disambiguation)
- Bruford (disambiguation)
