= Edward Willis Way =

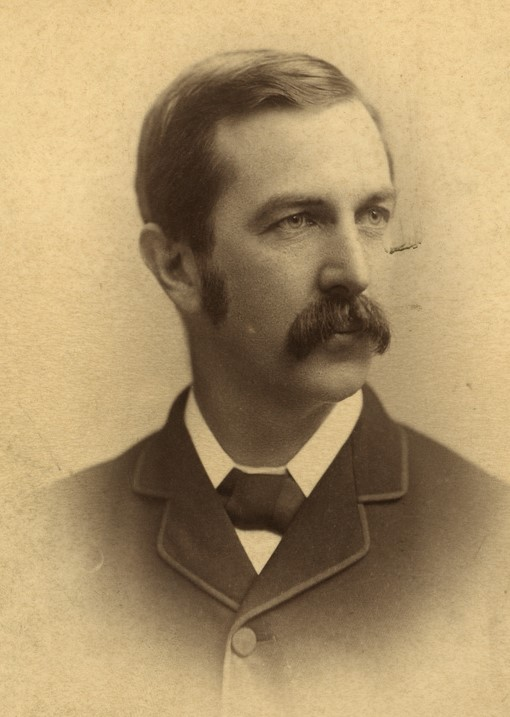

Dr Edward Willis Way (c.1847 – 28 September 1901), frequently written as "E. Willis Way", was a noted medical doctor and surgeon in the early days of the colony of South Australia.

== Early life and education ==
Way was a son of Rev. James Way of the Bible Christian Church, and brother of Sir Samuel Way, the noted jurist, and left for Adelaide with his parents as a young child in the Anna Maria, arriving on 14 November 1850. He was educated at AEI and St Peter's College before studying medicine at Guy's Hospital and the University of Edinburgh.

== Career ==
He returned to Adelaide and soon had a lucrative practice, though pursuit of wealth was not his prime concern. He was Medical Officer to the Stockade (later Yatala Labour Prison) and Health Officer to the Adelaide City Council. He established his own private hospital (previously Miss Baker's Private Hospital?) in North Adelaide. He lectured in obstetrics and gynaecology at the University of Adelaide.

Much of his work at the North Adelaide Hospital was taken over by James Alexander Greer Hamilton (c.1853 – 8 October 1925).

Way also worked at the Private Hospital, Wakefield Street and was Honorary Gynaecologist (and Physician) at the Adelaide Hospital. He was President of the South Australian branch of the British Medical Association from 1892 to 1893.

== Hospital controversy ==
Adelaide Hospital in the last decade of the 19th century was a dysfunctional workplace, riven with jealousies and intrigues. In 1895 a Royal Commission was called to investigate a promotion seen as favouritism, and the sacking of nurse Graham. Around the beginning of 1896 the Board of Adelaide Hospital, of which Way was a member, made changes in the nursing structure, one of the results being the promotion of Bessie Way, one of his daughters, to the position of Charge Nurse. Premier Kingston, who bore an antagonism towards Way, accused him of nepotism. Nurse Way avoided the disagreeable situation by accepting a somewhat better position with the Kalgoorlie Hospital in Western Australia. Kalgoorlie became the home of most, if not all, of his children.

== Family ==
He was brother of Sir Samuel Way and close friend of brother-in-law the Hon. Dr. Allan Campbell.

He and his wife (c.1850 – 20 October 1906) had a home on North Terrace, Adelaide and another residence at Strangways Terrace, North Adelaide. Among their children were:

- Inman Way, Resident Medical Officer, of Kalgoorlie Hospital.
- Eldest daughter Florence Jane Elizabeth "Bessie" Way (died 14 July 1949) married Arthur Vernon Harvey (1864 – 30 August 1901), mining investor of Kalgoorlie, and son of Arthur Harvey on 7 October 1896. He was killed at Devondale, South Africa in the South African War. She married again, to Captain C(harles) Stanley Tratman of the 22nd Battalion, 8th Brigade, 1st AIF, on 19 October 1915. She was first matron of Kalgoorlie Hospital, then its secretary, later matron of Ru Rua Hospital, North Adelaide.
- Second daughter Kate Isabel married William Arthur Irwin (ca.1860 – 12 October 1939), surveyor, on 18 April 1898, lived at South Perth.
- Third daughter Grace Mary "Gracie" Way married Henry Offley Irwin M.B., B.S. (ca.1871 – 31 January 1939) on 14 March 1898, lived at Boulder, Western Australia.
- Youngest daughter Marian married general practitioner (Arthur) Waldo Connelly (died 27 July 1946), of Boulder, Western Australia on 4 March 1903; later of Camberwell, Victoria.

== Death ==
He died suddenly on 28 September 1901, while performing a surgical operation at his private hospital, and was buried at the North Road Cemetery. A parliamentary debate on matters critical of Chief Justice Way was postponed out of respect for the loss of his brother.
