= James Way =

Bible Christian minister in South Australia (1804-1884)

Reverend James Way
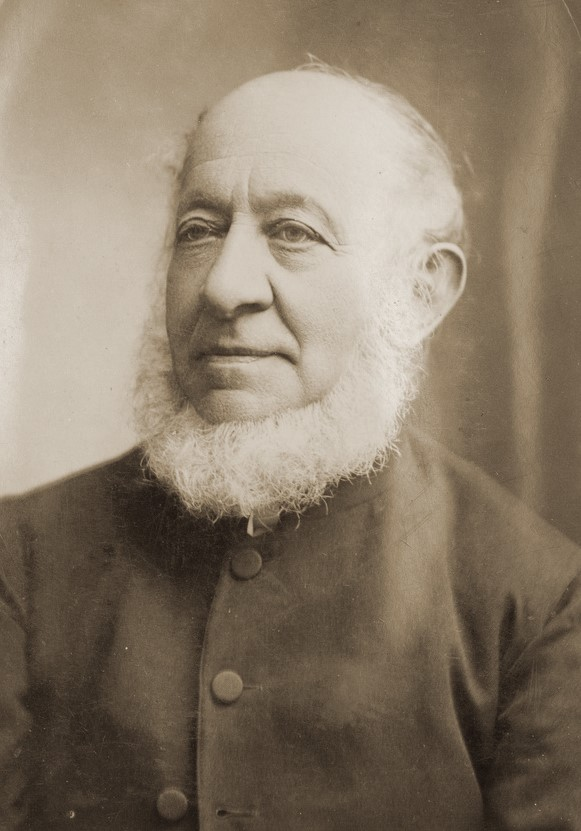
- James Way c. 1870
- Born: 17 June 1804; Morchard Bishop, Devon, England
- Died: 14 August 1884 (aged 80); Sea View near Noarlunga South Australia
- Occupation: Bible Christian minister

Rev. James Way (17 June 1804 – 14 August 1884) was a Bible Christian minister in the early days of the colony of South Australia, and for whom Way College was named. He was the father of Sir Samuel Way.

== History ==
Way was born in Morchard Bishop, Devon, and entered the ministry in 1826 and was elected President of the English Conference in 1847. He had been urged to take charge of the Canadian missions, but demurred, as his widowed mother depended on him. Subsequently Rev. James Thorne, one of the founders of the sect and secretary to the Missionary Society, asked him and Rev. James Rowe (22 October 1824 – ) to form a mission to Australia.

Rev. James Way left for South Australia on the Anna Maria, arriving in Adelaide in August 1850 along with his three younger children, his wife Jane, and her son Edward. Samuel Way, the eldest, remained behind to complete his studies, arriving in Adelaide in March 1853. Rev. Way soon came across Samuel Coombe of Brompton and P. P. Dungey, and visited J. R. Rundle, for whom he had a letter of introduction, and at whose butcher shop the first services were held.

Their first chapel, seating 160, was erected on Sixth Street, Bowden by builders George Cole and Simon Clarke, J. W. Cole being the architect, and the first services were held on 30 November 1851. In June 1852 the Sabbath School commenced operation under J. R. Rundle, and within a year had 80 pupils. Around 1855 it was decided to move into larger premises and in 1856 the foundation stone was laid by Rev. Way and the new 400-seat church building opened on 15 February 1857.

In 1855 he left for Victoria to open the Victorian Mission, which in 1860 became a separate district under the Rev. James Rowe, who from a base at Burra had established the northern circuit in South Australia.

Other churches were established in rapid succession: Yankalilla, Normanville, Finniss Vale, Peachey Belt, Willunga, Findon, and a host of others, were opened around 1855. The city chapel, in Young Street, was opened in August 1858.

In 1870 James Way retired from leadership of the church in South Australia, to be replaced by Rev. James Ashton (died December 1874). He retired from official work with the church in May 1876, 50 years from the commencement of his service. He died on 14 August 1884, at "Sea View" near Noarlunga South Australia, the residence of his son Samuel, and his funeral procession was attended by the Anglican and Roman Catholic Bishops as well the Governor and other dignitaries.

== Recognition ==
- The Bowden Bible Christian, later Methodist, Church, was renamed Way Memorial Church during the pastorate of C. E. Schafer (1915–1919).
- The private school founded by the Bible Christian and Primitive Methodist churches was christened "Way College"; after it had become Methodist Ladies College, W. G. Torr named his Brighton residence "Way Cottage".

== Family ==
James Way married Elizabeth ( – ); he married again, on 6 August 1833 to Jane Willis (October 1811 – 15 May 1878), who had a son from a previous marriage. Their children included:

- Samuel James Way (11 April 1836 – 8 January 1916) married the widow Katherine Gollan Blue (née Gordon) on 11 April 1898. They had no children.

(Katharine was the widow of Dr. William Archibald Sinclair Blue (died 18 September 1896), father of Shylie Katharine Blue (1882-1959), who was mother of Henry Way Rymill.)

- Elizabeth Way (August 1834 – 7 May 1903) married confectioner Frederick Dewe Beach (14 March 1829 – 14 November 1895) in 1852

- Marion Olive Beach (1873 – 6 December 1944) married Louis W. Yemm (died c. 16 January 1951) on 19 December 1900. They had no children.

- Florence Ann "Florrie" Way (1843 – 12 November 1924) married Dr. Allan Campbell (30 April 1836 – 30 October 1898) on 30 April 1868.

- eldest daughter Jean Campbell ( – 7 May 1937) married Sidney Weston (c. 1864 – 18 August 1914) on 10 April 1899
- Florence Way Campbell (1870 – c. 1861) married James Frederick "Fred" Downer LLB (1874 – 29 May 1942), son of John Downer and prominent businessman, on 3 September 1902. Their daughter Alleyne Joan Downer (7 May 1906 – c. May 1942) married Henry Way Rymill.
- Dr. Allan James Campbell (2 August 1872 – 19 March 1902) was surgeon in charge of the military hospital Harrismith during the Boer War, died of enteric fever.
- Dr. Archibald Way "Archie" Campbell ( – 30 May 1957) worked and lived in Fiji; his wife died in May 1924.
- James Way Campbell (14 August 1877 – 1956), solicitor, married Ethel Amy Crozier, née Trew, (20 July 1873 – 2 March 1939) widow of Edwin Crozier (c. 1859 – 21 November 1906) on 10 December 1912.
- Colin Campbell (7 December 1879 – 27 November 1943)
- fifth son Lieut. Neil Campbell (11 September 1882 – April 1918) served in Boer War, married (Margaret) Kathleen Gordon (13 July 1882 – ), daughter of John Hannah Gordon MLC, on 23 May 1914. He was member of Tunnelling Corps in World War I, killed in action.
- Capt. Gordon Cathcart Campbell MC and Bar (4 June 1885 – 13 August 1961) married Iris Fisher ( – ) on 7 August 1915 Iris was a daughter of umpire Isaac Alfred Fisher (12 April 1851 – 19 June 1944).

- Dr. Edward Willis Way (c. 1847 – 28 September 1901), noted surgeon and antagonist of Premier Kingston. He married three times: to Susan Elefer in London in June 1866; to Marion Inman (died 1879) in 1874; and to Sarah Hill in 1880. His children included:

- Dr. Inman Way (1 September 1876 – 1955) married Ethel Maude Cullen, died at Boulder, Western Australia.
- Grace Mary Way (1875– )
- Marion Way (1877–1965) married Arthur Waldo Connolly at Boulder, Western Australia on 4 March 1903.

== See also ==
- Serena Lake, daughter of Samuel Thorne and Bible Christian missionary to South Australia
