= HMS Burford =

Three ships of the Royal Navy have borne the name HMS Burford, after the English town of Burford and the subsidiary title of the Duke of St Albans:

- HMS Burford (1679) was a 70-gun third rate launched in 1679, rebuilt in 1699 and wrecked in 1719.
- HMS Burford (1722) was a 70-gun third rate launched in 1722 and broken up in 1752.
- HMS Burford (1757) was a 70-gun third rate launched in 1757 and sold in 1785.

A total of twelve battle honours were awarded to the ships of this name.
