= George Burford =

American soccer coach

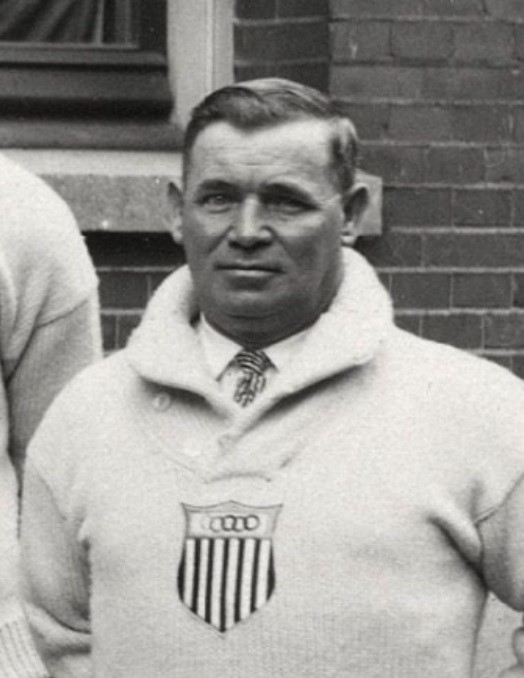
George Burford in 1928

George Henry Burford (December 25, 1875 – 1931) was an English-born American soccer coach. He was the second head coach of the United States men's national soccer team. He was at the helm for four games in 1924, winning two and losing two, and for two games in 1928, finishing with one loss and one tie. The first of those games was for the 1928 Summer Olympics, and saw the United States lose to Argentina 11–2, which eliminated the Americans from the Games. The second was a 3–3 draw against Poland. Burford was also the trainer of the aborted 1920 Polish Olympic team.

Burford worked as a fitness coordinated for many organizations including the Pennsylvania Railroad YMCA and Boston public schools.

Burford was born in Kidderminster, England on December 25, 1875. He died in Brockton, Massachusetts in 1931.
