= Della Burford =

Canadian artist and writer (born 1946)

Della Burford (born January 5, 1946, in Saskatoon, Saskatchewan) raised in Ottawa, Eston and Edmonton and is a Canadian artist and writer. Her Sacred Visionary Art has been inspired by dream, different cultures including India, ancient Celtic knowledge, shamanism, and imagination.

Burford has a certificate from NYSID and graduate degrees from the University of Alberta and Queen's University. She was a Design teacher at Humber College North for six years. In 1977, Della Burford's first book, Journey to Dodoland was published in Los Angeles where she toured festivals leading workshops for children. At The World Symposium for Humanity she saw Buckminster Fuller, embraced his philosophy, and started working for humanity. She has done storytelling, readings, live painting, writing and storytelling workshops at events and schools in Canada and internationally. Her books were plays in New York with Imaginations Unlimited. Two performances were at the Third Street School Settlement in New York and the Smithsonian Institution Discovery Theatre in Washington. In the 1980s, her paintings and stories began to focus on the environment, and she began performing environmental stories as part of a project opportunity in Harlem, New York City. In 1990 her book, The Magical Earth Secrets, was published by the Western Canada Wilderness Committee.

She studied shamanistic clowning with Richard Pochinko. She worked for 17 years as an artist for Inner City Angels, a Toronto program where artist visit classrooms and work with teachers and students to build and show artistic activities.

Della was taught painting by her mother Desiree Burford who was a student of Jack Shadbolt. Burford has created 30 years of Visionary "Dream Wheels". She presently lives on Vancouver Island.

== Publications ==
1. 'Journey to Dodoland' Los Angeles 1977 Printers Institute of America award Reference 2 In Review : Canadian Books for Young People
2. 'Magical Earth Secrets' 1990 Western Canada Wilderness Committee best seller Canada foreword David Suzuki ISBN 1-895123-01-1
3. 'Environmental Activity Guide' Teacher and Home Study - Art in Action, nature as inspiration, Azatlan Publishing 1992 ISBN 1-895123-01-1
4. 'Dodoland Adventures' 2009, smaller more compact version of 'Journey to Dodoland' ISBN 978-1-4196-7172-2
5. 'Journey to Lotus' poems and painting created in India, ISBN 978-0-9695611-9-4
6. 'Miracle Galaxy' 2009, Eight angels guide one into health and happiness ISBN 978-0-9695611-5-6
7. 'Bali Feeds the Soul', started with a poem by author/artist Della Burford, Fabrizio Belardetti and Dale Bertrand photographers. ISBN 978-1-927825-02-0
8. 'Bali Feeds your Dreams' Dreams lived, shared, and created, ISBN 978-1-927825-05-1
9. 'Spirit Storybooks' three traditional takes from around the world written by Aaron Zerah, Art by Della Burford, ISBN 978-0-9920553-4-9
10. 'Dream Wheels' over 40 years of dreams recorded in yearly dream wheels ISBN 978-0-9878302-2-7
11. 'Art for One World' Inspiration and Art Activities to make a difference! Featuring the work of Della Burford, Dale Bertrand and Kazuko Asaba ISBN 978-1-927825-07-5
12. 'Dream Gifts for the Planet Earth' Sacred animals teach us about our connection to the elements ISBN 978-1-927825-14-3
13. 'Star Galaxy for the World' Take kindness, peace, intuitive, wonder, dream, transformative, and creative action for the world ISBN 978-1-927825-15-0

== See also ==
- List of children's literature authors
- Visionary art
