= O. L. A. Burford =

Oliver Lambert Alan Burford R.A.N., A.D.C. (7 January 1860 – 23 October 1923), generally referred to as O. L. A. Burford, was an officer of the Royal Australian Navy.

== History ==
Burford was born in St. Peters, Hammersmith, Middlesex, to the Rev. Dr. Arthur Howard Burford and his wife Sarah Burford (née Spears). In 1873 he was apprenticed to the merchant fleet of Taylor, Bethel and Roberts, which between 1872 and 1878 traded to Brisbane and other ports in Australia, to India and South America, and while with them gained his Master's Certificate. In 1882 he joined the Royal Navy, and while with the service in Australia in October that year he joined the Victorian Navy.

Before Federation each Colony had its own navy: South Australia had its HMCS Protector.

In 1888 he was appointed Warrant Officer. In 1899 Burford was in the Victorian contingent which sailed to China to assist Britain in suppressing Chinese activism, dubbed the Boxer Rebellion. He served as gunner on HMS Phoenix. By the time they arrived the insurrection had been largely subdued; nevertheless Burford, by now a Sub-Lieutenant, was entitled to the China War Medal. Burford returned home in 1901 and was promoted to Chief Warrant Officer in the newly instituted Royal Australian Navy, then received a commission as Lieutenant in 1905.

On 1 July 1911 Burford was appointed District Naval Officer, stationed at Port Adelaide, where he proved himself a thoroughly capable administrator. The position was elevated to Acting Commander in 1912. Burford's diplomatic skills were put to the test during the 1916 South Australian coal strike, when he was given the unenviable task of rationing this essential commodity, which he performed with cool efficiency. By the outbreak of World War I Burford was too old for active service, and served on the mainland of Australia as Naval Transport Officer. He was promoted to captain in April 1918, and transferred to Fremantle, Western Australia as District Naval Officer.

In November 1922 he retired from the Navy to his farm "Tingira" (named for HMAS Tingira?) in West Warburton, and died less than a year later.

== Other interests ==
- He was an expert marksman and a champion revolver shot.

While in South Australia he was:

- involved in the Boy Scout movement and the Church of England Missions to Seamen at Port Adelaide
- a committeeman of the Royal South Australian Yacht Squadron.
- involved with the Cheer-Up Society, who gave him a farewell on his being transferred to Fremantle in September 1918

While in Western Australia:

- he was on 3 November 1920 a foundation member of the Port Yacht Club (became Fremantle Sailing Club in 1921), and given the title of Commodore.

== Family ==
Burford married Ellen Beatrice McMillan ( – 28 August 1942) at Williamstown, Victoria in 1887. They had five children.

- Sydney Burford engaged to Myola Green of Peppermint Grove, lived Mount Stirling
- Oliver Vincent Burford (24 February 1894 – 19 March 1927), died in New South Wales
- Mabel Burford married Bennett, lived in South Australia
- Mary Veronica "May" Burford married George Albert Pepper in 1916, lived in South Australia
- Ellen "Nellie" Burford married Harry Padgham, lived Quairading, Western Australia.

Nellie, his youngest daughter, may have lived with her mother and nursed her father, as his real estate was shared equally between her and his widow, while other assets were left to his other children.
