= Buford, Virginia =

Unincorporated community in Virginia, US

Coordinates: 36°34′01″N 79°32′46″W

Buford is an unincorporated community in Pittsylvania County, in the U.S. state of Virginia. It is mentioned in the Beale ciphers.
