= The Bluford Series =

Series of young adult novels

- Author: Ben Alirez; D.M. Blackwell; Karyn Langhorne Folan; Peggy Kern; Paul Langan; John Langan; Tanya Savory; Anne Schraff edited by Paul Langan
- Original title: Bluford High Series
- Illustrator: Gerald Purnell
- Country: United States
- Language: English
- Genre: Young adult, teen fiction
- Publisher: Townsend Press
- Published: 2002–2025 (more titles forthcoming)
- No. of books: 24
- Website: bluford.org

The Bluford Series is a collection of contemporary American young adult novels set in the fictional inner-city high school of Bluford High in Southern California. Bluford is named after Guion "Guy" Bluford, the first African-American astronaut. The series was created and published by Townsend Press and was co-distributed by Scholastic. As part of an effort to promote reading in underfunded school districts, Townsend Press originally made the Bluford Series available to schools for a dollar each. As of 2018, over 11 million copies of Bluford Series novels have been sold.

== Synopsis ==
The Bluford Series is set in Bluford High School, the fictional school all the main characters attend. Each novel features a teenage protagonist facing difficult challenges in and out of school. Topics explored in the books include bullying, school violence, teenage pregnancy, divorce, peer pressure, and substance abuse. Despite these gritty topics, the Bluford Series has been praised widely for its engaging stories and responsible handling of difficult subject matter, earning positive reviews in Kirkus Reviews, School Library Journal, and the Journal of Adolescent & Adult Literacy. While each novel in the Bluford Series can be read independently, the books are interconnected and represent a span of about two years at Bluford High.

== Reception ==
Reception for The Bluford Series has been positive, with the ALA picking many of the books in the series as "Quick Picks for Reluctant Young Adult Readers". The ALA also selected Bluford titles as "Popular Paperbacks". Educators in many states, including Florida and New York, have noted that the series has been well received by their student population.

Of Brothers in Arms (Bluford Series #9), the Journal of Adolescent & Adult Literacy wrote that the book's themes were applicable to struggling teens." Kirkus Reviews called Survivor (Bluford Series #20), "a brave young-adult novel" and said the Bluford Series "offers unflinchingly honest plot situations to engage and educate readers". Similarly, School Library Journal called Promises to Keep (Bluford Series # 19), "compassionate, insightful, and educational, along with being action-packed, realistic, and emotionally and psychologically accurate". Favorable reviews for many Bluford titles can be found in Kirkus Reviews. In addition, The Horn Book singled out the Bluford Series as "perennially popular among urban teens" and listed three Bluford titles as "Good YA Urban Novels."

== Other mentions ==
- A June 2025 review of "On the Run," Bluford Novel 24, in "Kirkus Reviews". The book is described as "a dramatic and moving story about the virtues of abandoning social media and getting on track with your values."
- A November 2023 article from "Black Enterprise" discussing possible adaptation of the Bluford Series into a film series.
- An August 2022 article from DeKalb County, GA detailing a popular and successful "school-wide reading program" that uses the Bluford Series to promote literacy and classroom engagement.
- An October 2021 article in Medium discusses how the Bluford Series has moved readers of color to "to read, write and imagine".
- The Bluford Series is called "a revelation" and credited in a June 2020 article in Education Week for playing a key role in encouraging reluctant readers to read and finish their first book.
- The Bully, a novel in the Bluford Series, is cited by educator/scholar Gerald Dessus for sparking a lifelong interest in reading and teaching. The article appeared in a February 2020 post in Literacy Now, a publication of the International Literacy Association.
- The Bluford Series is mentioned in a 2018 story in the Atlanta Journal-Constitution as being a centerpiece to promote literacy in the Atlanta metro area's public schools.
- Survivor was selected by the American Library Association/Young Adult Library Service Association (YALSA) as a 2014 Quick Pick for Reluctant Young Adult Readers. It was also chosen as a "Top 10" for 2014 by In the Margins, a publication that seeks books suited to the interests and challenges of marginalized teens.
- Search for Safety was selected by the American Library Association/Young Adult Library Service Association (YALSA) as a 2013 Popular Paperback.
- The Bluford Series was part of a 15-week study on the effectiveness of young adult literature as a therapeutic approach to students with emotional and behavioral disorders. This study was published in the April 2012 edition of the Journal of Adolescent and Adult Literacy and showed the Bluford Series to be a powerful catalyst to help students learn constructive behaviors in and out of the classroom. Full citation: Verden, C. E. (2012), Reading Culturally Relevant Literature Aloud to Urban Youths With Behavioral Challenges. Journal of Adolescent & Adult Literacy, 55: 619–628. doi: 10.1002/JAAL.00073
- Breaking Point, The Test and Pretty Ugly were selected by the American Library Association/Young Adult Library Service Association (YALSA) as 2012 Quick Picks for Reluctant Young Adult Readers.
- The Gun (published by Scholastic as "Payback") was chosen by the American Library Association/Young Adult Library Service Association (YALSA) as a 2012 Popular Paperback.
- No Way Out and Schooled were selected by the American Library Association/Young Adult Library Service Association (YALSA) as 2009 Quick Picks for Reluctant Young Adult Readers.
- Blood Is Thicker was selected by Mayor Daley's Book Club for a citywide reading initiative in Chicago in 2009.
- The Bully has been chosen by districts in multiple states for school-wide reading programs. It is also featured in Books That Don't Bore 'Em by James Blasingame, associate professor of English at Arizona State University and a former editor of The ALAN Review. Blasingame currently edits the "Books for Adolescents" pages of the Journal of Adolescent and Adult Literacy.
- In 2009 and 2010, Accelerated Reader listed the first 15 titles of the Bluford Series in the “top 40” books for both middle and high school struggling readers.
- Over 50,000 reviews for Bluford Series titles are available now on Goodreads. Search results for "Bluford series" (showing 1-20 of 30 books).
- More than 11 million copies of Bluford series novels have been sold as of 2018.
- The Bluford Series has been credited with helping to popularize "Street Literature" as a genre for young adults. While the Bluford Series lacks some of the explicit content found in adult "Street Lit," its focus on urban life and the challenges of inner city teens has earned it a mention in Dr. Vanessa Irwin Morris's The Readers' Guide to Street Literature and on the website, http://www.streetliterature.com.

== Titles ==
No.	Name	Published	Author	Plot
1	Lost and Found	2002	Anne Schraff	Darcy Wills is the main protagonist in the first book in the series. Darcy contends with the return of her long-absent father, the troubling behavior of her younger sister Jamee, and the beginning of her first relationship.
2	A Matter of Trust	2002	Anne Schraff	This is a sequel to Lost and Found. This book centers on Darcy's growing conflict with her old friend, Brisana Meeks. Amid jealousy and competition, Darcy fights for her relationship with Hakeem Randall and struggles with her fears over her own family's future.
3	Secrets in the Shadows	2002	Anne Schraff	Features Roylin Bailey, who first appeared in A Matter of Trust. Roylin makes a terrible mistake: He steals money to buy a gift for the girl of his dreams and finds himself in a nightmare he cannot escape.
4	Someone to Love Me	2002	Anne Schraff	Features Cindy Gibson from Lost and Found. Cindy struggles with a stormy relationship with her mother, ongoing trouble at school, a dangerous boyfriend, and worse. Will her fragile family survive?
5	The Bully	2002	Paul Langan	Darrell Mercer, a 9th grader at Bluford High, is at the center of this story. Darrell and his mother move to the Bluford area in the middle of the school year. Physically smaller than his peers, Darrell quickly becomes a target for Tyray Hobbs, the freshman class bully.
6	The Gun/Payback	2002	Paul Langan	The sequel to The Bully, this book is about Bluford freshman Tyray Hobbs, the tormentor of Darrell Mercer. The tale traces Tyray's troubled home life, his desire to rebuild his reputation, and his quest to get revenge on Darrell, the only boy who ever stood up to him.
7	Until We Meet Again	2002	Anne Schraff	Sequel to A Matter of Trust. This story continues the tale of the Wills family. Darcy learns that Hakeem, her first boyfriend, is moving out of the state. Then her grandmother's health declines and a mysterious new person comes into her life.
8	Blood is Thicker	2004	Paul Langan and D.M. Blackwell	Sequel to Until We Meet Again, featuring Hakeem Randall after his move to Detroit. Far from Bluford High, Hakeem quickly finds himself in a world of trouble, and his family is at the center of it. To complicate matters, a new girl hopes to make him forget Darcy forever.
9	Brothers in Arms	2004	Paul Langan and Ben Alirez	Features Martin Luna, a student at Bluford High, is at the center of this story. Haunted by the tragic death of his little brother, Martin seeks one thing: revenge. But his mother wants more for her only remaining child. Will Martin listen to her, or will he allow anger to control him?
10	Summer of Secrets	2004	Paul Langan	Darcy Wills is at the center of this tale, a sequel to Until We Meet Again. Darcy hides a painful secret from her friends and family. Yet others, including her parents and her childhood friend, are keeping secrets of their own. When the truth finally surfaces, Darcy's entire world is turned upside down forever.
11	The Fallen	2007	Paul Langan	This sequel to Brothers in Arms picks up the story of Martin Luna as he struggles to rebuild his life after the death of his little brother. In trouble at Bluford High School for fighting, Martin faces an even bigger problem at home: Frankie, the most feared homeboy from his neighborhood, is hunting him.
12	Shattered	2007	Paul Langan	Sequel to Summer of Secrets, as she begins her junior year at Bluford High School. Eager to repair her relationship with her old boyfriend Hakeem, Darcy discovers that one of her biggest fears has come true. And worse: her closest friends have been secretly lying to her.
13	Search for Safety	2007	John Langan	Search for Safety introduces Ben McKee, a new sophomore at Bluford High School. At home, Ben is living a nightmare. His mother has married Larry, an abusive man who wants nothing to do with his stepson. And when Larry loses his job and starts drinking, Ben finds himself—and his mother—in grave danger.
14	No Way Out	2009	Peggy Kern	No Way Out features Harold Davis from The Bully, Someone to Love Me, The Gun/Payback, and Search For Safety. Harold Davis is trapped. Medical bills for his sick grandmother are piling up, and a social worker has threatened to put him in a foster home. Desperate for money, he reluctantly agrees to work for Londell James, a neighborhood drug dealer. The choice leads him into a world of dangerous streets where no one is safe. Will Harold escape the violence that surrounds him, or will he become its next victim?
15	Schooled	2009	Paul Langan	In this book, Lionel Shepard, a freshman, is introduced. There's no backing down for Lionel Shephard. With a dream of joining the NBA, all he wants to do at Bluford High is play basketball. But everyone's trying to stop him. His father thinks basketball is a waste of time; his teachers don't know he can barely read and threaten to fail him; and his dropout friend Jamar wants him to quit school. Unsure where to turn, Lionel must make a choice. Will he pursue his dream or get caught in a nightmare?
16	Breaking Point	2011	Karyn Langhorne Folan and Paul Langan	Breaking Point features Vicky Fallon, who was also in Brothers in Arms and The Fallen. In this story, Vicky can't take it. Her father has lost his job. Her parents are constantly fighting, and her troubled little brother is out of control. Once an honor student, Vicky is quickly falling behind in her classes at Bluford High. Now her teachers, friends, and her new boyfriend, Martin Luna, want answers. Pressured from all sides, Vicky knows something is about to snap. But the explosion that hits her home is worse than anything she could imagine.
17	The Test	2011	Peggy Kern	The book features Liselle Mason, who appeared in Until We Meet Again. Liselle Mason is in trouble. For weeks, she ignored the changes in her body and tried to forget her brief relationship with Oscar Price, her moody classmate at Bluford High. But when Liselle's clothes stop fitting, and her brother notices her growing belly, she panics. A pregnancy test confirms her biggest fears. Unwilling to admit the truth, Liselle suddenly faces a world with no easy answers. Where will she turn? Who will she tell? What will she do?
18	Pretty Ugly	2011	Karyn Langhorne Folan	This book follows Jamee Wills the little sister of Darcy Wills, who has appeared in many titles including Lost and Found, A Matter of Trust, Someone To Love Me, The Bully, The Gun/Payback, Until We Meet Again, Summer of Secrets, Shattered, "Search For Safety", Schooled, and The Test. A freshman at Bluford High, Jamee never expected Vanessa Pierce and her friends to go this far. The trouble starts at cheerleading practice when Vanessa begins teasing Angel McCallister, a shy new girl at school. When the insults turn nasty, Jamee tried to stop them. She wins Angel's friendship but makes many enemies. Now Jamee is a target, and someone is texting lies and pictures of her all over Bluford. Unwilling to tell her family or snitch on her fellow cheerleaders, Jamee is cornered. Will her next move solve her problems—or make them worse?
19	Promises to Keep	2013	Paul Langan	This book follows Tyray Hobbs, a sequel to The Gun/Payback. No one likes Tyray Hobbs. Once a feared bully, he's become an outcast. At Bluford High, his peers taunt him for how he treated them. At home, his parents punish him for the trouble he's caused. Unable to escape his reputation or his past, Tyray is desperate. And when an unlikely friendship develops, he clings to it like a lifeline. Now that connection is threatened, and Tyray faces his toughest decision yet. Will his next move lead him to ruin or redemption—or both?
20	Survivor	2013	Paul Langan	This book follows Tarah Carson, a character who has appeared in many Bluford novels like Lost and Found, A Matter of Trust, Secrets in the Shadows, Until We Meet Again, Blood is Thicker, Summer of Secrets, Shattered and Pretty Ugly. Tarah Carson has hidden the secret for years. No one—not her mother, her friends at Bluford High, or even her boyfriend, Cooper Hodden—knows what her uncle did to her years ago. Tarah hoped to keep it that way. But an upcoming reunion is forcing Tarah's past into the present. And Uncle Rudy, the man who scarred her for life, is returning. Haunted by memories, Tarah plans to avoid him at all costs. But when her decision threatens to cause even more suffering in her family, she must face her past and biggest fear—alone.
21	Girls Like Me	2016	Tanya Savory	This book explores the backstory of Angel McAllister, a character who first appears in Pretty Ugly. Angel McAllister?s worst nightmare has come true. Her best friend, Sharice Bell, has discovered her most intimate secret. And a new enemy, LaDonna Burns, is on the warpath. Gossip and rumors are spreading through school like wildfire, and Angel?s classmates are turning on her. Can she bury the secret and put out the flames? Or will Angel face the truth?and its life-changing consequences?
22	The Chosen	2020	Karyn Langhorne Folan and Paul Langan	This book continues the story of Darcy Wills after the events of Shattered, Survivor, and Pretty Ugly. Darcy Wills feels the pressure. Her best friend, Tarah Carson, has grown distant and hostile since the start of the school year. And a medical crisis in Darcy's family has stress boiling over at home. When surprising news forces Darcy to look at the future beyond Bluford High, she realizes huge decisions are looming. Unsure what to do but unable to avoid what's coming, Darcy has no easy options. Her choices will cut both ways. Some doors will open, but others may close forever.
23	Alone	2021	John Langan and Tanya Savory	This book introduces fourteen-year-old Michael Tatem. There is no refuge for fourteen-year-old Michael Tatem. A childhood injury has made him a target at Bluford High. And deeper wounds at home have left him shy, isolated, and friendless. But an unexpected connection at school gives Michael a glimpse at a new life. Can he embrace it and forge a new path for himself? Or will his attempt backfire, leaving him more vulnerable and alone than ever?
24	On the Run	2025	Karyn Langhorne Folan	A gripping sports story and poignant coming-of-age tale that explores the upsides and downsides of social media. Naveah Kendricks never expected it to go this far. An outcast at Bluford High, she's spent much of her freshman year feeling awkward and lonely. Her one escape, her phone, has gotten her in major trouble—at school and at home. And now an old rivalry and a new threat have Naveah's back against the wall She is ready to fight, but some battles cannot be won. Is this one of them?

== Reading order of the series ==
=== Year 1 ===
The Darcy Wills and Classmates Sequence:

1. Lost and Found (Darcy Wills-sophomore-October)
2. A Matter of Trust (Darcy Wills-sophomore)
3. Secrets in the Shadows (Roylin Bailey-sophomore)
4. Until We Meet Again (Darcy Wills-sophomore-June)
5. Blood Is Thicker (Hakeem Randall-Darcy's boyfriend-June)
6. Summer of Secrets (Darcy Wills-July)
7. Survivor (Tarah Carson-August)
8. Shattered (Darcy Wills-junior-September)
9. The Chosen (Darcy Wills-junior-September)

The Martin Luna Sequence:

1. Brothers in Arms (Martin Luna-sophomore-July–September)
2. The Fallen (Martin Luna-sophomore-October)
3. Breaking Point (Vicky Fallon-Martin's new girlfriend-sophomore October)

=== Year 2 ===
The Jamee Wills and Classmates Sequence:

1. Girls Like Me (Angel McAllister-eight grade-June)
2. Pretty Ugly (Jamee Wills-Darcy Wills' younger sister-freshmen-September)
3. Schooled (Lionel Shepard-freshmen-October)
4. Someone to Love Me (Cindy Gibson-freshmen-October)
5. The Bully (Darrell Mercer-new freshmen-November to January)
6. The Gun (Payback) (Tyray Hobbs-freshmen-late January)
7. Promises to Keep (Tyray Hobbs-freshmen-late January and February)
8. No Way Out (Harold Davis-freshmen-March)
9. On the Run (Naveah Kendricks-new freshman-June to September)
10. Search for Safety (Ben McKee-new sophomore-August and September)
11. The Test (Liselle Mason-January)
