= Buford Nunley =

American baseball player

- First baseman
- Born: February 5, 1912; Des Arc, Arkansas, U.S.
- Died: December 5, 1979 (aged 67); South Bend, Indiana, U.S.

Negro league baseball debut
- 1932, for the Little Rock Grays

Last appearance
- 1932, for the Little Rock Grays

Teams
- Little Rock Grays (1932)

Buford B. Nunley (February 5, 1912 – December 5, 1979) was an American Negro league first baseman in the 1930s.

A native of Des Arc, Arkansas, Nunley played for the Little Rock Grays in 1932. In five recorded games, he posted three hits in 15 plate appearances. Nunley died in South Bend, Indiana in 1979 at age 67.
