= Buford F. Gordon =

American civil rights activist

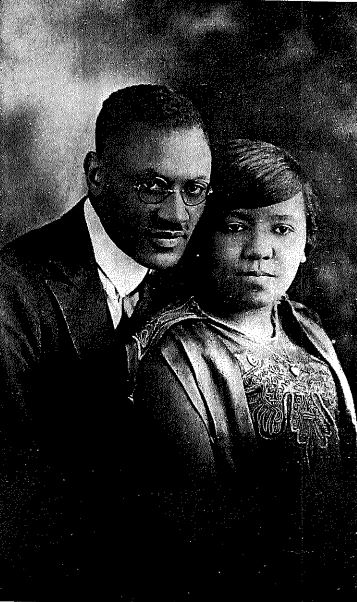
Buford F. Gordon and his wife, Thelma Pierce Gordon.

Buford F. Gordon (August 21, 1893 – 1952) was an African American civil rights activist, clergyman and social scientist. A master of divinity from the University of Chicago, Buford F. Gordon first was a pastor at the African Methodist Episcopal Zion Church of South Bend. In 1931, Gordon would become national Editor of Church Literature at the denomination. Later, Gordon would be elected first the bishop of the church's seventh district in 1944 and later of the ninth district. Gordon initially got an interest in the social science while studying for his degree in college. As a pastor in South Bend, Gordon wrote a history of Black Americans in the area entitled the Negro of South Bend in 1922. Gordon was an acquaintance of W.E.B DuBois and served on the executive committee of the NAACP.

== Early life ==
Gordon was born to Aaron and Matilda Gordon in Pulaski, Tennessee during 1893. His father was a literate landowner who worked as a farmer and laborer. At the urging of his two brothers, Gordon enrolled first in Fisk University in 1913 where he earned his degree in chemistry. Gordon first became interested in the social sciences during his studies there, where his mentor, George Edmund Haynes, practiced. Gordon studied an additional year at Yale before enlisting in the United States Army, where he attained the rank of Second Lieutenant. After returning home, Gordon pursued a master's degree in divinity at the University of Chicago. It was during his studies in Chicago that Gordon married the 18-year-old daughter of the family he boarded with, Thelma Pierce. He would also become aquatinted with DuBois during this time.

== Career ==
Gordon opened his cosmetics business, Chemical Manufacturing Co. in 1919 while studying in Chicago. After earning his degree, Gordon moved to the town of South Bend where an African Methodist Episcopal church was being built. Gordon spent his first few years in the town researching the history and living conditions of its Black residents. Going through newspaper and library records, Gordon eventually finished his first work, the Negro of South Bend, in 1922. Initially threatened by disgruntled White residents of the town, Gordon's church would finish construction in 1924. His congregation adored him for his advice and carefully planned out sermons. Gordon eventually resigned his position in South Bend in 1925, electing to, in his own words, "Do better in some other town." He became pastor at the Greater Wesley Temple of the African Methodist Episcopal Church in Akron, Ohio the same year. He stayed for six years. Gordon wrote his second book, Pastor and People in 1930. Six years later he would write Teaching for Abundant Learning. The same year, Gordon would be elected Bishop of the African Methodist Episcopal Zion Church. In 1944, then, Gordon once again was elected Bishop, this time of the tenth district. Gordon was an executive committee member of the NAACP in the later half of his life.
