= Ephraim John Burford =

British historian

Ephraim Burford (1905 – 22 July 1997) was an English historian and writer.

Burford was born in London and trained as an optician before later taking an interest in history. He fought against Franco in the Spanish Civil War

== Selected writings ==
- The Orrible Synne - a look at London lechery from Roman to Cromwellian Times. Calder & Boyars, London, 1973 ISBN 0-7145-1126-9
- Queen of the Bawds: The Story of Madame Britannica Hollandia and her House of Obsenitite, Hollands Leaguer, The Book Service, 1973 ISBN 0-8543-5451-4
- The Bishop's Brothels. 1993.
- Private vices - public virtues: Bawdry in London from Elizabethan times to the Regency. Robert Hale, London, 1995. (With Joy Wotton) ISBN 0709058225
- Bawdy Verse
