= Lolah Burford =

American novelist

Lolah Burford (18 March 1931, Dallas, Texas –2002) was an American novelist from Texas. She published six novels, and was married to poet William Burford. She graduated from Bryn Mawr College in 1951.

== Novels ==
- Vice Avenged: A Moral Tale (1971)
- The Vision of Stephen: An Elegy (1972)
- Edward, Edward (1973)
- MacLyon (1974)
- Alyx (1977)
- Seacage (1979)
