= Pamela Burford =

American novelist

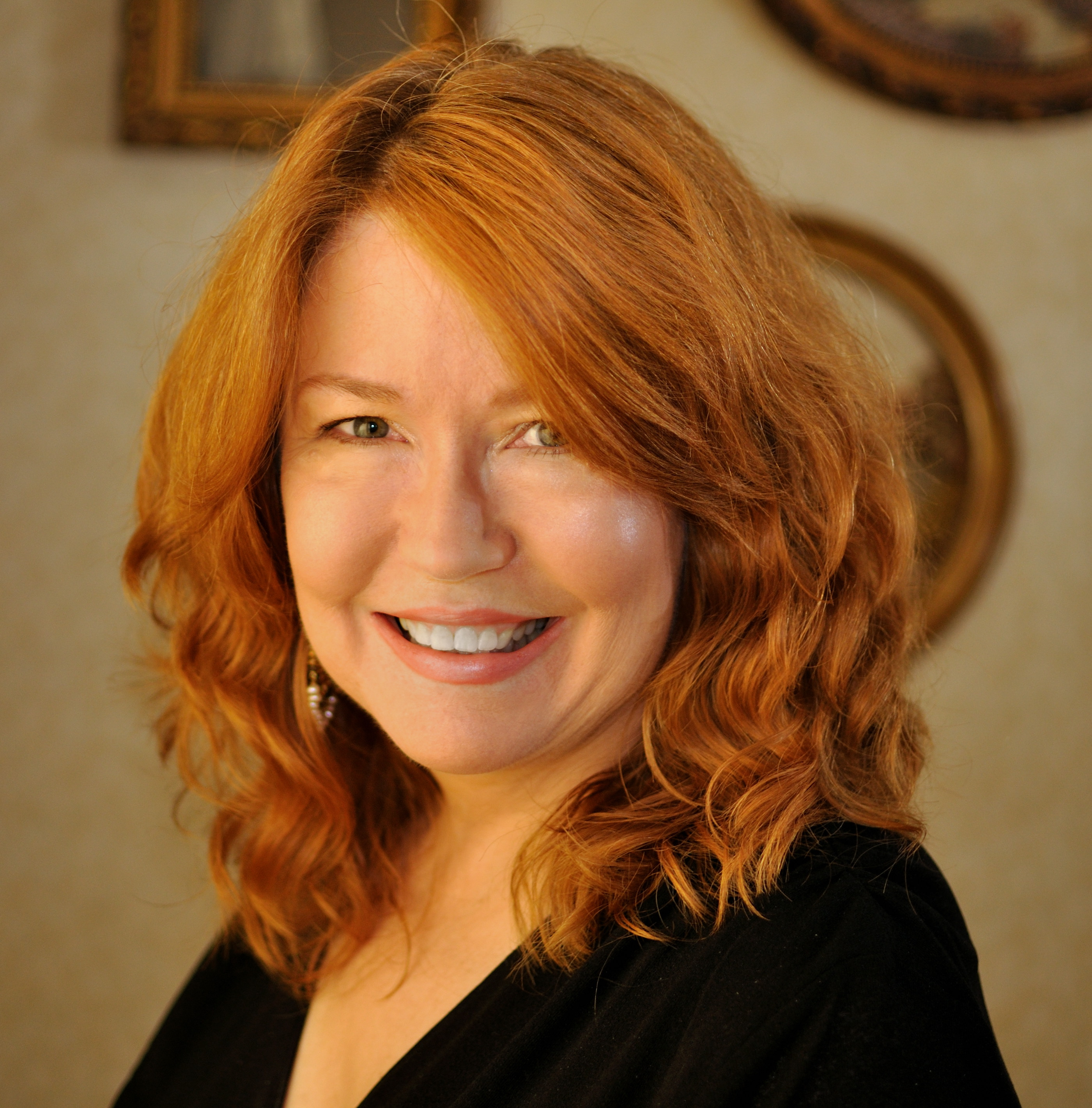
- Born: August 9, 1954 (age 72); Las Cruces, New Mexico, U.S.
- Occupation: Novelist
- Relatives: Patricia Ryan
- Writing career
- Period: 1996–present
- Genre: Romance
- Website: www.pamelaburford.com

Pamela Burford (born August 9, 1954 in Las Cruces, New Mexico, United States) is an American novelist. She is the author of 14 contemporary romance and romantic suspense novels, and she is the twin sister of the author Patricia Ryan (aka P.B. Ryan). Most of Pamela's novels are currently available as ebooks.

== Biography ==
Burford is a two-time finalist for both Romance Writers of America's RITA Award and Romantic Times Reviewers' Choice Award. She's founder and former president of Long Island Romance Writers, a chapter of Romance Writers of America, and is a frequent speaker at writers' conferences, workshops, and libraries.

Burford is married and has two children. Her "day job" is editor in chief of a free audio magazine anthology for blind and print-disabled adults.

== Bibliography ==
=== Single novels (most also available as ebooks) ===
- His Secret Side, 1996/02
- Twice Burned, 1997/05
- A Hard-hearted Hero, 1997/07
- Jacks Are Wild, 1997/11
- In the Dark, 1999/03
- A class Act, 1999/09
- Too Darn Hot, 2000/12

=== Wedding Ring Series ===
1. Love's Funny That Way, 2000/12
2. I Do, But Here's the Catch, 2001/01
3. One Eager Bride to Go, 2001/02
4. Fiancé for Hire, 2001/03

=== Only Ebooks ===
- Too Darn Hot (the "director's cut"), 2010/07
- Snowed, 2010/07
- Snatched, 2011/8

=== Omnibus in Collaboration (also available as an ebook) ===
- Summer Heat, 1998/08 (with her twin sister Patricia Ryan)

== References and sources ==
- Harlequin's web-page about Pamela Burford
- Fantastic-Fiction's list of books by Pamela Burford
