= Mrs A. Seager =

Australian businesswoman (1870–1950)

Mrs. A. Seager
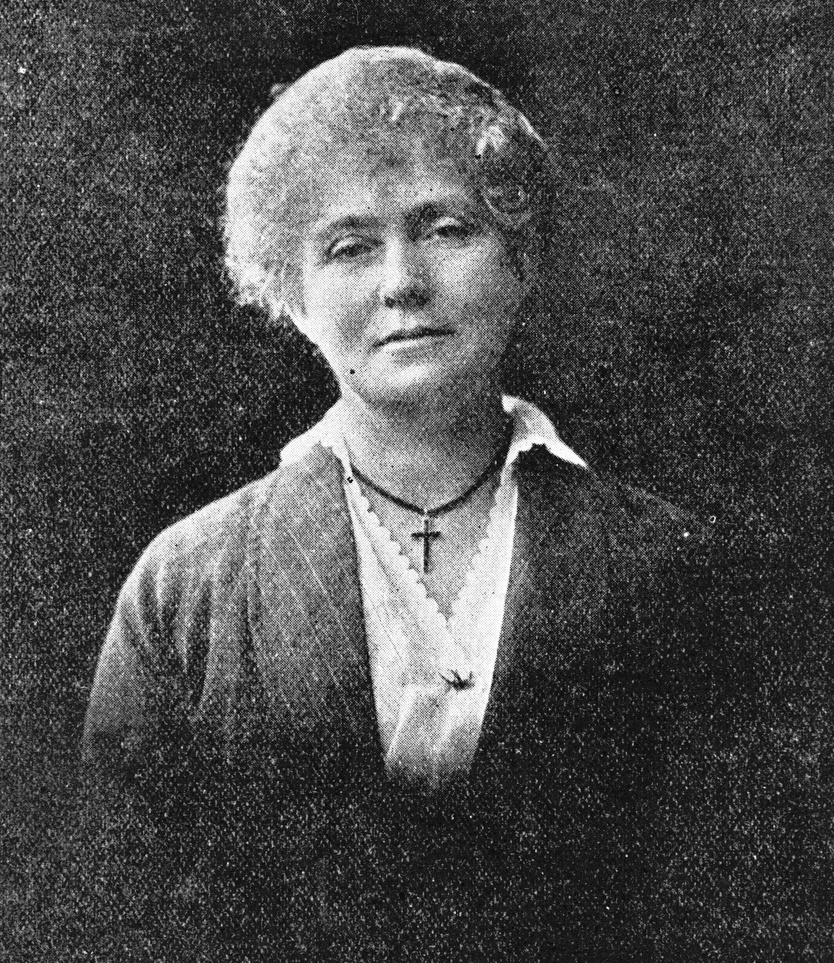
- Born: Alexandrine Laidlaw; 10 November 1870; Ballarat, Victoria
- Died: 12 March 1950 (aged 79)
- Known for: founder of the Cheer-Up Society

Alexandra Seager, (née Laidlaw; 10 November 1870 – 12 March 1950), generally known as Mrs. A. Seager, was a businesswoman and philanthropist in South Australia, remembered as the founder of the Cheer-Up Society which provided comforts for servicemen in World War I.

== History ==
Seager, whose birth name may have been Alexandrine or Alexandrina, was born in Ballarat, Victoria, the eldest daughter of William Laidlaw, formerly of Wanlockhead, Scotland ( – ) and his wife Helen Meikle Laidlaw, née Dickson ( – ) who married at Ballarat in 1869.

She married Clarendon James Seager (c. 1857 – 1941) on 16 June 1891 and settled in Adelaide in 1908. She opened a governess and domestic servant placement business "Scholastic Agency, Royal Exchange" on King William Street, Adelaide in 1911 or earlier.

The South Australian first contingent of the 1st AIF was the subject of a great deal of public excitement and media attention. Not so the second contingent: in November 1914, after visiting her son at the Morphettville training camp she decided they could use a morale boost. She organised hundreds of volunteers to cater for a "Cheer Up Our Boys" luncheon at Montefiore Hill for the 1,100 soldiers who were training under canvas at the Morphettville and Jubilee Oval camps, and were about to be posted overseas.

From this sprang the Cheer-Up Society, with thousands of (mostly) woman volunteers, in dozens of branches throughout the State, who did much good work during the war, and of which Mrs. Seager was the indefatigable Hon. Secretary. President was William John Sowden.

After the "Cheer-up Hut" was opened Seager was appointed (on a salary) as its "very able, very zealous, very efficient, and very tactful" manager of nearly 100 branches, farewell entertainments to around 3,000 men.

The Society was wound up in 1920. During the Great Depression she was active in providing inexpensive hot meals to unemployed workers from what was once the Cheer-up Hut, then with her husband retired to their sons' soldier-settler property on Kangaroo Island.

== Other activities ==
She wrote a popular song, "Our Soldier's Song", to a tune by Louis William Yemm, which was a "hit" with soldiers. Not to be confused with a similarly popular song of the same name by H. Brewster Jones and C. R. Beresford.

== Recognition ==
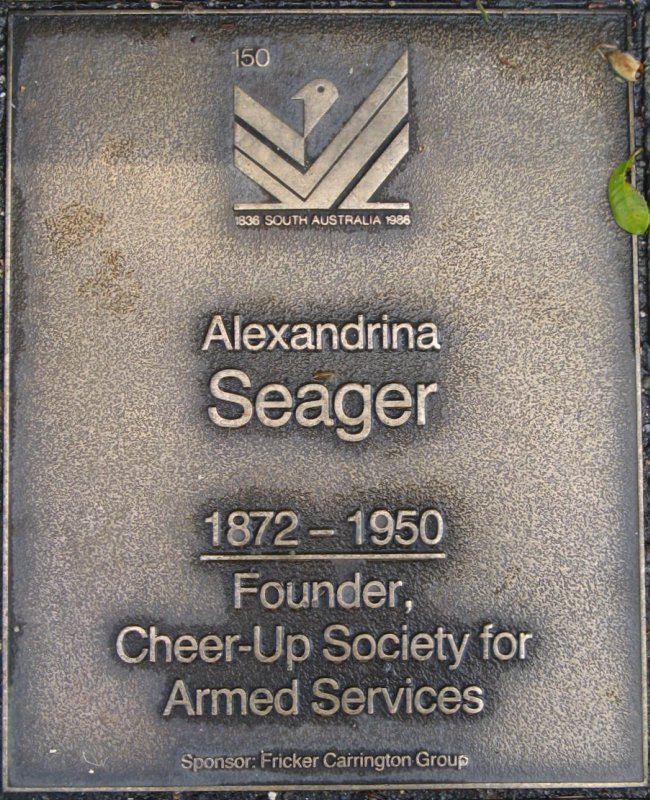
Seager's plaque on the Jubilee 150 Walkway, North Terrace, Adelaide.

Mrs Seager never sought the limelight, to the point of having an assistant read her reports, nor any material recognition of her selfless volunteer work. She was however recognised in the King's silver jubilee list of 1935.

She was in 1986 recognised by a plaque on the Jubilee 150 Walkway, North Terrace, Adelaide.

== Family ==
Alexandra Laidlaw married Clarendon James Seager (c. 1857 – 1941) on 16 June 1891; they had six children:

- Major Harold William Hastings Seager MC (6 July 1893 – 1976) married Joyce "Joy" Debenham Tearne on 28 July 1925. They had one son.
- Edward Clarendon Seager (c. 1895 – 1965) married Mavis Lavinia Ann Jones in 1925

The two brothers served with the 1st AIF and were allocated land on Kangaroo Island, on which they raised sheep.

- George Rothwell Seager (c. October 1897 – 7 August 1915) killed at Gallipoli.
- Helen Seager (1900 – 1981)
- Nina Clarendon Seager (1902 – 18 December 1975) married Reginald H(erbert) E(arn) Murray on 3 October 1928, lived at "Hathaway, Mount Lofty". He was a descendant of John Murray, 1st Marquess of Atholl.
- Florence Emilie "Flo" Seager (1907–1991) married Dean Charlton Wood (8 July 1910 – 27 February 1998) in 1935. Dean was a brother of Rex Wood.
