= Charles Lee Bufford =

American convict

Charles Lee Bufford (born 1954) is an African-American man who was initially convicted of robbing and murdering William Roland Cooper, Jr., a probate judge in Wilcox County, Alabama, but was later retried and found not guilty. He had been sentenced to death, but his murder conviction was overturned when part of the death penalty law in Alabama was ruled unconstitutional. He was retried, but was acquitted despite his videotaped confession and the fact that he was arrested while driving the victim's car. One juror later said, "We thought four years was enough for what he did."

Deeming the verdict a miscarriage of justice, federal authorities unsuccessfully searched for a way to try Bufford on federal charges for the murder.

Bufford later returned to prison for raping an elderly woman in Connecticut.

== Background ==
Charles Lee Bufford had been convicted of auto theft and was incarcerated in the Wilcox County jail for a brief sentence when he was temporarily released to the custody of Roland Cooper, a probate judge and former Alabama state senator. The program allowing this type of work release was unofficial and allowed citizens to take informal, temporary custody of inmates for the day. Bufford was 23 at the time, and Cooper sought Bufford's help in his garden.

Roland Cooper was a former Alabama state senator and had been given the nickname "the Wily Fox of Wilcox". His legislative tenure lasted almost 20 years, and he had been regarded as one of the state's most well-known and effective lawmakers. He had then resigned his Senate seat upon his appointment as probate judge for Wilcox County by Governor George Wallace.

== The crimes and arrest ==
Roland Cooper was killed on April 30, 1977. That evening, Bufford was found driving Cooper's vehicle toward Selma, several miles away from Cooper's home. He said he had consumed six beers, and he was arrested for driving under the influence. Cooper's body was discovered at his home in the garden. He was age 63.

When giving a statement to police, Bufford admitted to losing his temper and hitting Cooper in the head with a garden tool, but he stated that when he left the scene, Cooper was still alive. He said the attack was in response to Cooper cussing him for improperly planting corn in the garden.

== Trials ==
Bufford was found guilty of murder and robbery on May 19, 1978, and he was sentenced to death.

However, part of the Alabama death penalty law under which Bufford had been convicted was ruled unconstitutional in 1980. Bufford's conviction was overturned and he was given a new trial. At the new trial, Bufford was represented by two attorneys, William Faile and John Kelly. The prosecution was unable to produce much evidence at the new trial and the jury acquitted Bufford of the crimes after only two hours of deliberation.

Several factors led to the jury's decision to free Bufford, even though he had previously admitted to attacking Cooper and had been arrested while driving the victim's car. Bufford's handwritten confession had been destroyed without explanation, and the typed version presented at the trial was missing key details. Additionally, in an email to a reporter, one juror said the jury's rationale was that, "We thought four years was enough for what he did." The prosecution also claimed that the all-black jury selected for the case influenced the decision.

The verdict was widely decried as a miscarriage of justice. Federal authorities unsuccessfully searched for a way to try Bufford on federal charges for the murder.

== Release and aftermath ==
On November 12, 1981, Bufford was released from the penal system.

In October 1983, Bufford attacked and repeatedly raped a 65-year-old woman in Stamford, Connecticut. In June 1984, he pleaded guilty to first degree sexual assault and was sentenced to 17 years in prison.
