= Bluford =

Bluford may refer to:

== People ==
Surnamed

- Ferdinand D. Bluford (1882-1955) U.S. educator
- Guion Bluford (born 1942), U.S. astronaut
- Lucile Bluford (1911-2003) U.S. journalist
- Terry Bluford Moore (1912-1995) U.S. baseball player
- Albert Bluford Walker (1926-1992) U.S. baseball player
- Floyd Bluford Henry III (born 1968) U.S. baseball player

with this given name

- Bluford Duck (1858-1895) Old West outlaw
- Bluford Wilson (1841-1924) Solicitor General of the United States of America

== Places ==
- Bluford, Illinois

== Other uses ==
- The Bluford Series, a series of young adult novels

== See also ==
- Bruford (disambiguation)
- Bufford
- Buford (disambiguation)
- Blue (disambiguation)
- Blu (disambiguation)
- Ford (disambiguation)
