= Bruford =

Bruford may refer to:

== Musical groups ==
- Anderson Bruford Wakeman Howe
- Bruford (band)
- Bruford Levin Upper Extremities
- Bill Bruford's Earthworks

== Places ==
- Rose Bruford College

== People with the surname ==
- Alex Bruford, founder of Infadels
- Bill Bruford (born 1949), English drummer
- Marjorie Frances Bruford (1902-1958), British artist
- Michael W. Bruford (born 1963), British molecular ecologist and conservation biologist
- Robert Bruford (1868–1939), English farmer, agriculturist and politician
- Walter Horace Bruford (1894–1988), British scholar of German literature

== Albums ==
- The Bruford Tapes
- Anderson Bruford Wakeman Howe (album)
- Bruford Levin Upper Extremities (album)

== See also ==
- Bluford (disambiguation)
- Buford (disambiguation)
- Burford (disambiguation)
- Bufford
