= 1970 Birthday Honours =

British government recognitions

The 1970 Queen's Birthday Honours were appointments to orders and decorations of the Commonwealth realms to reward and highlight citizens' good works, on the occasion of the official birthday of Queen Elizabeth II. They were announced in supplements to the London Gazette of 5 June 1970.

At this time honours for Australians were awarded both in the United Kingdom honours on the advice of the premiers of Australian states, and also in a separate Australia honours list.

The recipients of honours are displayed here as they were styled before their new honour, and arranged by honour, with classes (Knight, Knight Grand Cross, etc.) and then divisions (Military, Civil, etc.) as appropriate.

== United Kingdom and Commonwealth ==
=== Baron ===
Life Peers

- Cyril Hamnett. For services to the Co-operative Movement.
- Sir Laurence Kerr Olivier. For services to the Theatre.
- Sir Max Leonard Rosenheim, KBE, MD, FRCP, President, Royal College of Physicians.
- The Right Honourable Lord Wheatley. For public services in Scotland.

=== Privy Counsellor ===
- The Right Honourable William, Baron Hughes, CBE, DL, Minister of State, Scottish Office.
- John Morris, Minister of Defence for Equipment.

=== Knight Bachelor ===
- Charles Frederic James Barker, MBE. For services to the food industry and to Export.
- Leonard Frederick Behrens, CBE. For public services.
- Professor George Edward Gordon Catlin. For services to Anglo-American relations.
- William Alexander Roy Collins, CBE, chairman and managing director, William Collins, Sons and Company Ltd. For services to Export.
- Samuel Crowe Curran, DL. For services to Technology and Education.
- Frank Fraser Darling, vice-president, Conservation Foundation.
- Arthur Eric Courtney Drake, CBE, chairman, British Petroleum Company Ltd.
- St John de Holt Elstub, CBE, managing director, Imperial Metal Industries Ltd. For public services and services to Export.
- Charles Forte, chairman, Forte Holdings Ltd.
- Ralph Freeman, CVO, CBE, Senior Partner, Freeman Fox & Partners, Consulting Engineers.
- William George Gillies, CBE. For services to Art.
- Professor Harry Godwin. For services to Ecology and Botany.
- Maurice Frederick Hackett, OBE, chairman, South East Region Economic Planning Council and chairman, North West Metropolitan Regional Hospital Board.
- Charles Edgar Mathewes Hardie, CBE, chairman, British Overseas Airways Corporation.
- Julian Stephen Alfred Hodge, chairman, Hodge Group Ltd.
- Thomas Norman Arthur Jeffcoate, FRCS, FRCOG, Professor of Obstetrics and Gynaecology, University of Liverpool.
- Ronald Ernest Charles Johnson, CB, Secretary, Scottish Home and Health Department.
- Francis Avery Jones, CBE, FRCP, MRCS, Physician, Department of Gastro-Enterology, Central Middlesex Hospital.
- Lieutenant-Colonel Charles Gordon Larking, CBE. For services to the British Legion.
- Ronald George Leach, CBE, Senior Partner, Peat, Marwick, Mitchell & Company.
- John Laurence Longland. For public services.
- John McWilliam. For services to local government in Fife.
- David Christie Martin, CBE, Executive Secretary, The Royal Society.
- Robert Frederick Payne, President, The Law Society.
- Norman Robert Reid, Director, Tate Gallery.
- Norman Andrew Forster Rowntree, Director, Water Resources Board.
- Edward Walters Senior, CMG, chairman, Ransome, Hoffman, Pollard Ltd. For services to Export.
- Arnold Weinstock, managing director, General Electric and English Electric Companies Ltd. For services to Export.
- Charles Henry Trelease Williams, CBE, chairman, Iron and Steel Industry Training Board.
- John Alexander Willison, OBE, QPM, DL, Chief Constable, West Mercia Constabulary.
- Kenneth Millns Wood, chairman, Concrete Ltd. For services to Export.

Diplomatic Service and Overseas List

- Isadore Victor Elyan, lately Chief Justice, Swaziland.
- John Michael Parsons. For services to British Commercial interests in India.
- The Honourable Edward Trenton Richards, CBE. For public services in Bermuda.
- Dermot Joseph Sheridan, CMG, Chief Justice, Uganda.
- Major William Thomson, OBE, JP. For public services in Gibraltar.

State of New South Wales

- The Honourable Mr. Justice Bernard Sugerman, QC, President of the Court of Appeal.
- Elton Reginald Griffin, CBE. For services to industry and commerce.
- Robert Wentworth Norman. For services to banking and the community.

State of Victoria

- The Honourable Murray Victor Porter, Agent-General for Victoria in London.
- Major-General Robert Joseph Henry Risson, CB, CBE, DSO, ED. For distinguished services to the community.

State of South Australia

- The Honourable Mr. Justice Reginald Roderic St Clair Chamberlain, QC, Senior Puisne Judge, Supreme Court of South Australia.

State of Western Australia

- Thomas Edward Jewell Wardle, Lord Mayor of the City of Perth, for services to commerce and the community.

State of Tasmania

- Allan Walton Knight, CMG, Chief Commissioner, Hydro-Electric Commission of Tasmania.

=== Order of the Bath ===
==== Knight Grand Cross of the Order of the Bath (GCB) ====
Military Division

- Admiral Sir Peter John Hill-Norton, KCB.
- General Sir Richard Michael Power Carver, KCB, CBE, DSO, MC, ADC (Gen.), late Royal Armoured Corps, Colonel Commandant Royal Tank Regiment, Colonel Commandant, Corps of Royal Electrical and Mechanical Engineers.
- Air Chief Marshal Sir Brian Kenyon Burnett, KCB, DFC, AFC, ADC, Royal Air Force.

Civil Division

- Sir Philip Allen, KCB, Permanent Under-Secretary of State, Home Office.

==== Knight Commander of the Order of the Bath (KCB) ====
Military Division

- Vice Admiral Peter Maxwell Compston, CB, Royal Navy.
- Lieutenant General Peter William Cradock Hellings, CB, DSC, MC, Royal Marines.
- Lieutenant-General Sir Basil Oscar Paul Eugster, KCVO, CB, CBE, DSO, MC, (65413), late Foot Guards, Colonel Irish Guards.
- Lieutenant-General John Aubrey Taylor Sharp, CB, MC, (76719), late Royal Regiment of Artillery, Colonel Commandant Royal Regiment of Artillery.
- Air Marshal John Barraclough, CB, CBE, DFC, AFC, Royal Air Force.

Civil Division

- Sir William Richard Joseph Cook, CB, Chief Adviser (Projects and Research), Ministry of Defence.
- Philip Rogers, CB, CMG, Second Permanent Secretary, Civil Service Department.

==== Companion of the Order of the Bath (CB) ====
Military Division

Royal Navy

- Surgeon Rear Admiral (D) William Ivon Norman Forrest, QHDS, LDS, RCS.
- Major General Ian Stewart Harrison.
- Rear Admiral Ian Wyndham Jamieson, DSC.
- Rear Admiral Ian Stewart McIntosh, DSO, MBE, DSC.
- The Venerable Archdeacon Ambrose Walter Marcus Weekes, QHC, AKC.
- Major General Anthony Patrick Willasey-Wilsey, MBE, MC.

Army

- Major-General Francis James Cecil Bowes-Lyon, OBE, MC, (74591), late Foot Guards.
- Major-General Edward Michael Hall, MBE, (66041), late Corps of Royal Engineers.
- Major-General Roy Stuart Marshall, OBE, MC, MM, (224271), late Royal Regiment of Artillery.
- Major-General Maurice David Price, OBE, (64554), late Royal Corps of Signals, Colonel Commandant Royal Corps of Signals.
- Major-General Charles William Woods, MBE, MC, (71873), late Corps of Royal Engineers.

Royal Air Force

- Air Vice-Marshal Cecil Howard Beamish, QHDS, FDSRCS.
- Air Vice-Marshal Geoffrey Percy Sansom Thomas, OBE.
- Air Vice-Marshal Ruthven Lowry Wade, DFC.
- Air Commodore John Lawrence Wemyss Ellacombe, DFC.

Civil Division

- Arthur Hugh Chaplin, Principal Keeper of Printed Books, British Museum.
- Thomas Alfred Graham Charlton, Assistant Under-Secretary of State, Ministry of Defence.
- Edward Victor Denis Glazier, Director, Royal Radar Establishment, Ministry of Technology.
- Charles Addison Somerville Snowden Gordon, Principal Clerk, Table Office, House of Commons.
- Bernard Gottlieb, Under-Secretary, Ministry of Posts and Telecommunications.
- Douglas Owen Henley, Third Secretary, HM Treasury.
- John Arthur Hudson, Deputy Under-Secretary of State, Department of Education and Science.
- Fred Matthias Kearns, MC, Deputy Secretary, Ministry of Agriculture, Fisheries and Food.
- William Allan Cunningham Mathieson, CMG, MBE, Deputy Secretary, Ministry of Overseas Development.
- George Irvine Mitchell, Legal Secretary, Lord Advocate's Department.
- John Lawrence Paisley, MBE, Chief Highway Engineer, Ministry of Transport.
- Theodore Burton Fox Ruoff, CBE, Chief Land Registrar.
- James John Sutherland Shaw, Deputy Secretary, Civil Service Department.
- Charles Edward Gordon Smith, MD, MRCP, Director, Microbiological Research Establishment, Ministry of Defence.
- James Alexander Young, Permanent Secretary, Ministry of Agriculture for Northern Ireland.

=== Order of Saint Michael and Saint George ===
==== Knight Grand Cross of the Order of St Michael and St George (GCMG) ====
- Sir Bernard Alexander Brocas Burrows, KCMG, Permanent United Kingdom Representative on the North Atlantic Council, Brussels.

==== Knight Commander of the Order of St Michael and St George (KCMG) ====
- Sir Kenneth George Grubb, CMG, for services to the Church of England.

Diplomatic Service and Overseas List

- Peter Allix Wilkinson, CMG, DSO, OBE, HM Ambassador-designate, Vienna.

==== Companion of the Order of St Michael and St George (CMG) ====
- William Lewis Bell, MBE, Head of the British Development Division in the Caribbean, Ministry of Overseas Development.
- Professor Cecil Terence Ingold. For services to Higher Education Overseas.
- George Russell Lee, Acting Assistant Director, Ministry of Defence.

Diplomatic Service and Overseas List

- William Stovold Carter, CVO, lately Foreign and Commonwealth Office.
- Donald McDonald Gordon, Foreign and Commonwealth Office.
- Donald Frederick Hawley, MBE, Counsellor (Commercial), HM Embassy, Baghdad.
- John McKenzie, MBE, Deputy British High Commissioner, Calcutta.
- Kenneth Edward Mackenzie, lately Counsellor (Commercial), HM Embassy, Stockholm.
- Kenneth Charles Parsons, OBE, Foreign and Commonwealth Office.
- The Honourable Richard John McMoran Wilson, Foreign and Commonwealth Office.

State of New South Wales

- Albert Oliver, Under-Secretary and Comptroller of Accounts, New South Wales Treasury.

State of Victoria

- Robert John Southey, President of the Liberal Party of Victoria.

State of Queensland

- Laurence John Hartley Teakle. For distinguished services to university education and administration.

State of South Australia

- Ernest Melville Schroder. For distinguished service to industry and the State.

=== Royal Victorian Order ===
==== Knight Commander of the Royal Victorian Order (KCVO) ====
- Air Vice-Marshal Alan Hunter Cachemaille Boxer, CB, DSO, DFC.
- Allen John Bridson Goldsmith, CVO, MB, BS.
- Lord Adam Granville Gordon, CVO, MBE.
- Sir David Lumsden Webster, Kt, FRCM.

==== Commander of the Royal Victorian Order (CVO) ====
- The Most Honourable Patricia, Marchioness of Abergavenny.
- Mark Baring.
- Colonel Sir Thomas Pierce Butler, Bt, DSO, OBE.
- Colonel Donald Hamish Cameron of Lochiel, TD, JP.
- Roger Thomas Baldwin Fulford.
- Roy Frederick Lloyd, CBE, MVO.
- The Honourable Mary Anne Morrison.
- Deputy Assistant Commissioner Ferguson George Donaldson Smith, DFC, Metropolitan Police.
- Walter John George Verco, MVO.

==== Member of the Royal Victorian Order (MVO) ====
At this time the two lowest classes of the Royal Victorian Order were "Member (fourth class)" and "Member (fifth class)", both with post-nominal letters MVO. "Member (fourth class)" was renamed "Lieutenant" (LVO) from the 1985 New Year Honours onwards.

Members of the Fourth Class

- Commander Brian Colin Gallagher, Royal Navy.
- Captain Richard Leoline Jenkins, Queen's Dragoon Guards.
- Stanley William Lionel Rivers Lucking, MVO.
- Laurence Ernest Nicholson.
- John O'Connor.
- Commander Peter Maxwell Stanford, Royal Navy.
- Chief Superintendent Herbert John Snowley, Thames Valley Constabulary.
- Thomas Hunter Thomson.

Members of the Fifth Class

- Francis William Collins.
- Reginald Charles Fisher.
- Sydney James Mooney.

==== Medal of the Royal Victorian Order (RVM) ====
In Silver

- Thomas Aspden.
- John Birchenough.
- Leonard Walter Cuff.
- Chief Writer Richard Saxon French, P/MX 771296.
- Frank Gannon.
- George Grant.
- Susan Jones.
- Reginald Anthony McSweeney.
- S4180389 Sergeant Terence Oakden, Royal Air Force.
- Emily Edith Oliver.
- Yeoman Bedgoer Joseph Patterson, Her Majesty's Bodyguard of the Yeomen of the Guard.
- Police Constable Duncan McCarter Scott, Metropolitan Police.
- George Thomas Frederick Smith.
- Robert Henry White.

=== Order of the British Empire ===
==== Knight Grand Cross of the Order of the British Empire (GBE) ====
Civil Division

- Sir Ian Frank Bowater, DSO, TD, Lord Mayor of London.

==== Dame Commander of the Order of the British Empire (DBE) ====
Civil Division

- Dorothy Elizabeth Ackroyd, Director, Consumer Council.
- Margaret Isabel Cole, OBE. For services to Local Government and Education.

==== Knight Commander of the Order of the British Empire (KBE) ====
Civil Division

- The Right Honourable Randal John Somerled, Earl of Antrim, DL, chairman, The National Trust.

Diplomatic Service and Overseas List

- Sir Charles Demoree Newbold, CMG, QC, lately President, Court of Appeal for East Africa.

State of Queensland

- The Honourable Mr. Justice Joseph Aloysius Sheehy, lately Senior Puisne Judge, Supreme Court of Queensland.

==== Commander of the Order of the British Empire (CBE) ====
Military Division

Royal Navy

- Captain Edgar George Brown, ADC.
- Colonel Jeremy John Day, ADC.
- Captain Malcolm Charles Denman.
- Marine Superintendent Norman Richard McLeod, Royal Fleet Auxiliary Service.
- Captain Ian Fraser Sommerville, Royal Navy (Retd.).

Army

- Brigadier Christopher John Codner, MC, (94294), late Royal Regiment of Artillery.
- Brigadier Frank Willoughby John Cowtan, MBE, MC, (95190), late Corps of Royal Engineers.
- Colonel Ernest Frederick Thomas Desbois, ERD, (232010), late Royal Army Ordnance Corps, Territorial and Army Volunteer Reserve.
- Brigadier Denis Carlo Basil Luke Esmond-White, MBE, MC, ADC, (67030), late Royal Regiment of Artillery.
- Colonel Frederick Samuel Goodwin (348497), late Royal Army Ordnance Corps.
- Brigadier John Michael Hardwicke Lewis, OBE, (85569), late Corps of Royal Engineers.
- Brigadier Maurice Edgar MacGregor MacWilliam, DSO, MC, TD, (92801), late Infantry, now R.A.R.O.
- Brigadier Corran William Brooke Purdon, MC, (112917), late Infantry.
- Brigadier John Richard Ruthven Ray, OBE, MC, (378247), late Royal Regiment of Artillery.

Overseas Awards

- Colonel Frank Rennie, MBE, MC, Fiji Military Forces.

Royal Air Force

- Air Commodore Oswald Gradon, OBE.
- Acting Air Commodore Geoffrey Crerar Cairns, AFC.
- Group Captain Robert Neil Greig Allen, DFC.
- Group Captain Douglas Cecil Goodrich.
- Group Captain John Moreton Nicholls, DFC, AFC.
- Group Captain John Robson Rogers.
- Group Captain Denis Peter John Smith, DFC.

Civil Division

- Edward Burns Abbot, chairman, Imperial Chemical Industries Fibres Ltd. For services to Export.
- Frederick Rudolph Althaus, Member, Council of the Stock Exchange.
- Vere Arbuthnot Arnold, MC, TD, DL, chairman, Runcorn Development Corporation.
- Janet Baker (Janet Abbott Shelley), Singer.
- David Mathers Balfour, managing director, Balfour Beatty & Company Ltd. For services to Export.
- Roland Barnes, MB, FRCS, Professor of Orthopaedic Surgery, University of Glasgow.
- William Thomas Barton, Director, Rank Hovis McDougall Ltd.
- Hugh Cecil Bean, Violinist.
- Lionel John Bellamy, Chief Scientific Officer, Ministry of Technology.
- Norman John Maurice Bennett, managing director, Wiggins Teape Ltd. For services to Export.
- Thomas Geoffrey Seager Berry, Parliamentary Agent to HM Government.
- Cecil Herbert Spence Blatch, lately President, Union Internationale des Avocats.
- George Frederick Blumer, Assistant Secretary, Department of Employment and Productivity.
- George Henry Bolsover, OBE, Director, School of Slavonic and East European Studies, University of London.
- Forester Richard John Britten, Joint Managing Director, Britten-Norman Ltd. For services to Export.
- Pauline Ruth Burnet. For services to the East Anglian Regional Hospital Board.
- Alan Burrough, chairman, James Burrough Ltd. For services to Export.
- Richard Walter Burton, Actor.
- Ronald Byrne, Headmaster, Wright Robinson High School, Manchester.
- Patrick Richard Cahill, OBE, Director and chief executive officer, Legal & General Assurance Society Ltd.
- George Edmund Cameron, chairman, Northern Ireland Industries Development Advisory Committee.
- Kenneth Macrae Campbell, MBE, chairman and managing director, British-India Steam Navigation Company Ltd.
- Alan Raymond Leofric Chorlton, Director of Education, Oxfordshire County Council.
- Edward Gwynfryn Davies, Alderman, Glamorgan County Council.
- Frederic Clive De Paula, TD, lately Industrial Adviser, Department of Economic Affairs.
- William McLachlan Dewar, OBE. For services to Scottish Education.
- Henry Makin Draper, lately Registrar of County Courts, Lord Chancellor's Department.
- Major-General Godfrey Maxwell Dyer, DSO, OBE, chairman, Not Forgotten Association.
- The Right Honourable Lionel Gordon Baliol, Viscount Esher, Architect.
- Professor Emyr Estyn Evans, Director, Institute of Irish Studies, Queen's University, Belfast.
- James Alexander Faulkner, OBE, chairman, Ulster Savings Committee.
- Donald William Fry, Director, Atomic Energy Establishment, Winfrith, United Kingdom Atomic Energy Authority.
- William John Poulton Maxwell Garnett, Director, The Industrial Society.
- William Sinclair Gauldie. For services to Architecture and Building in Scotland.
- Jocelyn Easton Gibb, chairman, Land Settlement Association Ltd.
- Hugh Gary Gilson, Director and Secretary, Freshwater Biological Association.
- Robert William Victor Gittings, Author.
- William Derek Hadfield Gregson, Assistant General Manager, Ferranti (Scotland) Ltd.
- Bernard Griffiths, Regional Chairman, South Wales Region, National Bus Company.
- Henry Robert Hall. For services to Music.
- Charles William Hayward, chairman, Hayward Foundation.
- Maurice James Goodwin Hearley, Chief Inspector, Department of Education and Science.
- Roy Galbraith Henderson. For services to Music.
- Enid Margery Hofton, Head Teacher, Raleigh County Infants School, Nottingham.
- Eric Montagu Price Holmes, chairman, Executive Committee, United Nations Association.
- James Hopwood, Alderman, East Riding of Yorkshire County Council.
- Arthur Clifford Howard, President, Rotary Hoes Ltd. For services to Export.
- Arthur Leslie Charles Humphreys, managing director, International Computers Ltd. For services to Export.
- John Henderson Hunt, FRCP, FRCS, President, Royal College of General Practitioners.
- Harold Hutchinson. For services to Journalism.
- Neil Atkinson Iliff, deputy chairman, Shell Chemicals (U.K.) Ltd.
- William Robert Jeffcott, chairman, Board of Governors, United Cardiff Hospitals.
- Ivor Jenkins, Technical Director, Delta Metal Company Ltd.
- Stanley Johnson, managing director, British Transport Docks Board.
- Derek Hugh Fawcett Joyce, lately Transport Adviser, Shell Mex and BP Ltd.
- Hans Peter Juda, OBE. For services to Art.
- Alderman Margaret Elizabeth Keay, BEM. For services to Education in Leicestershire.
- Olaf Kier. For industrial and social services.
- Harold Knox King, OBE, City Engineer, Corporation of London.
- Geoffrey Egerton Knight, chairman, Filton and Weybridge Divisions, British Aircraft Corporation Ltd. For services to Export.
- Jack Walter Lambert, DSC, Literary and Arts Editor, The Sunday Times. For services to the Arts.
- William Marshall Farquharson-Lang, chairman, North-Eastern Regional Hospital Board, Scotland.
- Theodore Angelo Roderick Levett. For services to the Church Assembly.
- William Edwin Everard Lockley, Town Clerk, Preston County Borough.
- Hubert Arthur Long, Deputy Secretary, Exchequer and Audit Department.
- Leslie Ashby Macdonnell, OBE. For services to the Army Benevolent Fund, Royal Air Force Benevolent Fund and Royal Air Forces Association.
- Daniel McGarvey, President, Amalgamated Society of Boilermakers, Shipwrights, Blacksmiths and Structural Workers.
- John Alan Maudsley, City Architect, Birmingham.
- William d'Auvergne Maycock, MVO, MBE, MRCP, MRCS, Superintendent, Lister Institute Blood Products Laboratory, Elstree.
- Michael Jacob Montague, chairman, Asia Committee, British National Export Council. For services to Export.
- Basil Desmond Neame, lately chairman, Agricultural, Horticultural & Forestry Industry Training Board.
- Geoffrey Sheard Nelson, General Manager, Finance Corporation for Industry Ltd.
- Edward Morel Neville, Assistant Chief Valuer, Board of Inland Revenue.
- Nigel Desmond Norman, Joint Managing Director, Britten-Norman Ltd. For services to Export.
- Cyril Leslie Oakley, MRCS, LRCP, Brotherton Professor of Bacteriology, University of Leeds.
- George Henry Albert Othen, Regional Controller, North Western Region, Department of Health and Social Security.
- Frederic Louis Passmore, Director (A), Board of Trade.
- Montague Mattinson Pennell, managing director, B.P. Exploration Company.
- Nadine Sheila Peppard, General Secretary, Community Relations Commission.
- Reginald Moses Phillips. For charitable services.
- Robert Russell Race, MRCS, FRCP. Director, Medical Research Council Blood Group Unit.
- The Reverend Professor John Kelman Sutherland Reid, TD, Honorary Secretary, Joint Committee on New Translation of the Bible.
- Denis Eric Rooke, Member for Production and Supply, The Gas Council.
- The Honourable Leopold Oliver Russell, OBE, TD, Director-General, Cement & Concrete Association.
- Martin Guthrie Russell, Assistant Secretary, Home Office.
- John Richard Schlesinger, Film Director.
- Thomas Winn Scholey, Alderman, Lindsey County Council.
- George Frederick Brian Scruby, Senior Partner, Sir Frederick Snow & Partners, Consulting Engineers.
- Robert Edward Graham Shillington, OBE, Deputy Chief Constable, Royal Ulster Constabulary.
- Albert Siddall, Deputy Managing Director, Joseph Lucas Ltd. For services to Export.
- Thomas Lawrence Somerscales, General Secretary, Joint Committee of the Order of St. John of Jerusalem and the British Red Cross Society.
- John Stein. For services to Scottish Football.
- Carol Humphrey Vivian Sutherland, Keeper, Heberden Coin Room, Ashmolean Museum, University of Oxford.
- John Albert Taylor, OBE, QPM, Chief Constable, Leicester and Rutland Constabulary.
- Robert Oswald Walker, LRCP, LRCS, Consultant Dental Surgeon, United Birmingham Hospitals.
- Grace Margery Westbrook, Matron, Southmead Hospital, Bristol.
- Professor Hugh Trefor Williams. For services to agriculture and agricultural economics.
- Thomas Christopher Williams, QPM, Chief Constable, Sussex Constabulary.
- Peter Cecil Wilson, chairman, Sotheby & Company. For services to Export.
- Roy William Wright, deputy chairman and Deputy Chief Executive, Rio Tinto-Zinc Corporation.

Diplomatic Service and Overseas List

- Thomas Holmes Evelyn Battersby Ashworth. For services to the British community in Tripoli.
- Douglas Ernest Barnett, lately Controller and Auditor General, Kenya.
- Philip William Brundell. For services to the British community in Buenos Aires.
- Duncan Murray Cameron, MB, ChB, Director of Medical Services, Sabah.
- Cyril Inglis Crocker. For services to British interests in Lisbon.
- Sidney Davis. For services to British commercial interests in Nigeria.
- Alfred Mario Fluhmann, OBE, British Consul, Basle.
- John Albert Fryer, MC, lately Director of Lands and Surveys, Sabah.
- Thomas Joseph Gibbs, JP. For public services in Grenada.
- Ronald Wynford Thomas Griffith, lately Industrial and Engineering Adviser to the Cyprus Government.
- John William Heffernan, OBE, Head of Reuter's Bureau, Washington.
- Reginald Ibison, lately managing director of Sembawang Shipyard (Pte) Limited, Singapore.
- Kendal George Lamon Isaacs, QC, VicePresident of the Senate, Bahama Islands.
- Stewart Frederick Thomas Brassington Lever, OBE. For services to British banking interests in Singapore.
- James McDonaugh, OBE, British Council Representative in Germany.
- Douglas Sampson Mackenzie, OBE. For services to the British community in Santiago.
- The Honourable John Robin Plowman, OBE. For public services in Bermuda.
- Wing Commander Kenneth James Powell, DFC, Royal Air Force (Retd.). For services to British interests in Germany.
- William Bruce Rae-Smith, MC. For services to British interests in Japan.
- Thomas Russell, OBE, Financial Secretary to the Western Pacific High Commission.
- John Anthony Holt Saunders, DSO, MC, JP. For services to banking in Hong Kong.
- Richard Henry Barter Snow, MBE, MB, B.Chir, Director of Medical Services, Bahrain.
- Peter Anthony Ivan Tahourdin, OBE, lately British Council Representative in Yugoslavia.
- Tang Ping-yuan, OBE, JP. For public services in Hong Kong.

State of New South Wales

- William Henry Brotherson, President of the Maritime Services Board.
- Francis Joseph Carberry, of Sydney. For distinguished services to the community.
- Augustus Noel Grayson. For distinguished services to the community.

State of Queensland

- William Guildford Allen Sr. of Longreach. For distinguished services to the pastoral industry and to the community.

State of South Australia

- Charles Ronald Aitken, of Kensington Park. For distinguished services to amateur athletics.

State of Western Australia

- Bruce MacKinlay. For distinguished services to industry and the community.

State of Tasmania

- Sinclair Jeavons Thyne, JP, of Launceston. For distinguished public services.

==== Officer of the Order of the British Empire (OBE) ====
Military Division

Royal Navy

- Commander George Blackwood, DSC.
- Commander Guy Vandemere Pascoe Crowden.
- Wardmaster Commander Gordon Cecil Hamilton.
- Commander John Bethell Hervey.
- Commander James Stephen Mackonochie.
- Instructor Commander Clifford Gordon Mount.
- Commander Daniel Joseph O'Leary, MBE.
- Commander Tom Vaughan Gerald Phillips, DSC.
- The Reverend Robert William Pope, Chaplain.
- Engineer Commander Henry Thomas Rice.
- Commander John Druce Sayer.

Army

- Lieutenant-Colonel Raymond Walter John Arthur (285390) Royal Regiment of Artillery.
- Lieutenant-Colonel Albert John Lawrence Cahill, TD, (263273), Intelligence Corps Territorial and Army Volunteer Reserve.
- Lieutenant-Colonel Alec Walter Carter (401561) Royal Army Ordnance Corps.
- Lieutenant-Colonel David Norman Court (190015) The Queen's Regiment.
- Lieutenant-Colonel Ian Ranald Critchley (335313) The Black Watch (Royal Highland Regiment).
- Lieutenant-Colonel Albert Arthur Dacre, MBE, (382521) Royal Corps of Signals.
- Lieutenant-Colonel Henry Salusbury Legh Dalzell-Payne, MBE, (408326) 3rd Carabiniers (Prince of Wales's Dragoon Guards).
- Lieutenant-Colonel John Bovill Denham (312967) Scots Guards.
- Lieutenant-Colonel Ronald Moynaugh Devlin (193625), Royal Army Ordnance Corps, now R.A.R.O.
- Lieutenant-Colonel John Philip Hart (390908) Royal Corps of Signals.
- Lieutenant-Colonel Eric Jim Hellier, MBE, (391565) Royal Corps of Signals.
- Lieutenant-Colonel (acting) Terence Albert James Kelly (186664), Army Cadet Force.
- Lieutenant-Colonel Herbert Charles Millman (393219) The Queen's Regiment.
- Lieutenant-Colonel Lennox Alexander Hawkins Napier, MBE, MC, (397999) The Royal Regiment of Wales.
- Lieutenant-Colonel Herbert David Rogers (373779) Royal Regiment of Artillery.
- The Reverend Denis Maurice Ryle, Chaplain to the Forces 2nd Class (355747) Royal Army Chaplains Department.
- Lieutenant-Colonel Kenneth Saunders (148549) Royal Army Pay Corps.
- Lieutenant-Colonel Geoffrey Ferguson Sharland (228390) The Light Infantry.
- Lieutenant-Colonel Peter Frank Aubrey Sibbald (393285) The Light Infantry.
- Lieutenant-Colonel Colin Gifford Stonor, MC, (108168) The King's Own Scottish Borderers.
- Colonel (local) Philip James Cornwallis Trousdell (114103) The Royal Irish Rangers (27th (Inniskilling) 83rd and 87th).
- Lieutenant-Colonel Richard Maurice Hilton Vickers, MVO, MBE, (400100), The Blues and Royals (Royal Horse Guards and 1st Dragoons).
- Lieutenant-Colonel Peter David Williams, TD, (423719), Royal Corps of Transport. Territorial and Army Volunteer Reserve.

Overseas Awards

- Lieutenant-Colonel John Anthony Marsh, DSO, The Bermuda Regiment.

Royal Air Force

- Acting Group Captain Harry Stansfield.
- Acting Group Captain John Ernest William Teager, AFC.
- Wing Commander William Leslie Green, DFC, (163032).
- Wing Commander Arthur Evan Gregory (55482).
- Wing Commander Adrian Philip Greenwood Holden (41412).
- Wing Commander Peter Hutchins (203003), RAF Regiment.
- Wing Commander William Frank Knapper (582015).
- Wing Commander Edward Richard Lacey, DSO, (134518).
- Wing Commander Jerrold Le Cheminant, DFC, (126148).
- Wing Commander Ronald Herbert Smith (58336).
- Wing Commander Robert Victor Stirling (54188).
- Wing Commander Charles Aubiey Thomas (3109017).
- Wing Commander Francis Alexander Tonkin (51408).
- Acting Wing Commander Peter Richard Brookman (127706), RAF Volunteer Reserve (Training Branch).

Civil Division

- Stanley Abbott, Controller, Standard Weights and Measures Department, Board of Trade.
- Robert Menzies Adam, Pedigree Stock Breeder and Livestock Judge, Angus.
- Captain Harry John Aldiss, RD, Royal Naval Reserve, Master Superintendent, Fisheries Laboratory, Lowestoft, Ministry of Agriculture, Fisheries and Food.
- Reginald Alsop. For services to the community in Cambridge.
- Moira Anderson (Mrs. Macdonald), Singer.
- Stanley James Baker. For services to agricultural journalism.
- Gordon Banks. For services to Association Football.
- Philip Gerald Barber, MBE, TD, chairman, British Council for Aid to Refugees.
- Ernest George Barnard. For services to the community in Portsmouth.
- Richard Robert Oliver Barwick, MBE, managing director, R. J. Barwick & Sons Ltd.
- Walter Edward Batty, Principal Scientific Officer, Ministry of Technology.
- Harry Roy Baxendale, Commercial Director, Preston Division, British Aircraft Corporation. For services to Export.
- Thomas Austin Hamilton Baynes. For services to the Magistracy.
- Alfred John Charles Beck, Alderman, London Borough of Hillingdon.
- Eunice Belbin, Director, Industrial Training Research Unit, University College, London.
- Sydney Iredale Benson, Director of Housing, Leeds.
- Phyllis Eleanor Bentley, Author.
- Alleyne William Steward Berry, Alderman, Bath City Council.
- Ian Ritchie Bishop, Leader, Royal Society and Royal Geographical Society expedition in the North East Mato Grosso, Brazil.
- Bertram Guy Blampied, Jurat, Royal Court of Guernsey.
- Alvan Bennett Blanch, Farmer and Farm Machinery Manufacturer, Wiltshire. For services to Export.
- Samuel James Blount, Headmaster, Nutfield Priory School for the Deaf, Redhill, Surrey.
- Harry Kebbell Bourne, Principal Scientific Officer, Department of Education and Science.
- Betty Boyce, Group Matron, Altnagelvin Hospital, Londonderry.
- Walter Edwin Boyce, County Welfare Officer, Essex.
- Charles William Bramford, Midland Area Manager, British Road Service Parcels Ltd.
- John William Breckenridge, Assistant Controller of Contracts, Post Office.
- Leslie Crystal James Brett, Head of United Kingdom Legal Services, Legal Department, Unilever Ltd.
- George Bridge, MD, DObst, lately Regional Medical Officer, Department of Health and Social Security.
- Henrietta Smith Brocklehurst, chairman, Hull "A" Group Hospital Management Committee.
- David McPherson Broome. For services to Show Jumping.
- Janet Muir Brougham. For services to local government in Dundee.
- John Thomas Brown, managing director, Atlas Express Ltd.
- Charles Court Bryan, FRCS(Ed), LRCP. For services to medicine in Glamorgan.
- Hugh Owen Moss Bryant, MB, ChB, Medical Officer of Health, West Bromwich.
- Colonel Thomas Alfred Buchanan, DSO, MC, ERD, TD, DL, Principal, Ewell County Technical College, Surrey.
- Leslie William Buckler, Consulting Engineer, Rolls-Royce Ltd. For services to Export.
- Ernest Burden, Senior Chief Executive Officer, Ministry of Transport.
- Charles Henderson Burnett, MBE. For services to the Agricultural Industry in Northern Ireland.
- Arthur Reginald Cannell, MBE, chairman, Birkenhead, Wallasey, Wirral and District War Pensions Committee.
- Margaret Brown Carmichael, Director of Nursing, Moorfields Eye Hospital Group.
- Frances Mary Chamberlain, HM Inspector of Schools, Department of Education and Science.
- Robert Douglas Chapman, Adviser for the Teaching of English as a Second Language, Birmingham.
- Walter Thomas Chesters, Group Chief Metallurgist, David Brown Gear Industries, Huddersfield.
- Dorothy Maud Coombe, Adviser on the Education of Immigrant Children, Manchester.
- James Alfred Cowell, Principal, Scottish Development Department.
- Stanley Frank Crook, Chief Officer, West Sussex Fire Brigade.
- Kenneth Charles Francis Davies, Foreign and Commonwealth Office.
- Joan Davison, chief executive officer, Civil Service Department.
- Ralph Davison, QPM, Chief Constable, Teesside Constabulary.
- Judith Olivia Dench, Actress.
- Leslie Hugh Dickerson, Chief Civil Engineer, North of Scotland Hydro-Electric Board.
- Edward Pattison Dinsdale, Export Manager, Conveyancer Fork Trucks Ltd, Warrington. For services to Export.
- William Arthur Eden, formerly Surveyor of Historic Buildings, Greater London Council.
- Thomas St. John Henderson Ellis, Crown Estate Receiver, Somerset and Wiltshire Estates.
- Charles Ewart Escritt, Secretary, Oxford University Appointments Committee.
- John William Evans, Councillor, Thurrock Urban District Council.
- John Raymond Berridge Evison, Director of Parks and Gardens, Brighton.
- Stanley Fawcett, chief executive officer, Ministry of Defence.
- Bertram James Foster, Traffic Commissioner, West Midland Traffic Area.
- James William Foster, DFC, Commandant, Metropolitan Area, Royal Observer Corps.
- Benjamin Price Francis, Clerk to the Justices, City of Coventry.
- David Paradine Frost. For services to Television.
- Violet Flower Chipchase, Lady Furness, County President, Berwickshire Branch, British Red Cross Society.
- Edward Wharton Gearey, General Dental Practitioner, Guildford.
- Captain Egerton Antony Hammond Gepp, lately Chief Marine Superintendent, Ocean Steam Ship Company Ltd.
- Henny Gestetner, Director, Gestetner Ltd. For services to Export.
- David Merton Gilbert, Divisional Manager, Hunting Engineering Ltd, Ampthill, Bedfordshire.
- Albert Arthur Goode, lately General Manager, Exhibitions, Society of Motor Manufacturers and Traders Ltd. For services to Export.
- Leslie Walter Goringe, Senior Chief Executive Officer, Home Office.
- John Aidan Hastings Gott, MBE, GM, QPM, Chief Constable, Northampton and County Constabulary.
- Allison Mary Campbell Greenlees, Branch Director, Northumberland Branch, British Red Cross Society.
- Vera Gertrude Griffin, MBE, Deputy Establishment Officer, United Kingdom Atomic Energy Authority.
- John Watkin Griffiths, Chief Examiner, Companies Investigation Branch, Board of Trade.
- Reginald Ronald West Grigson, TD, County Engineer and Surveyor, Leicestershire County Council.
- Albert Edwin Guttridge. For services to The Boys' Brigade and the community in the Isle of Wight.
- Robert Montague Hall, Sales Director, Joseph Cheaney Ltd. For services to Export.
- Leonard Cooper Halliwell, MBE, chairman, Joint Pricing Committee, National Health Service.
- Jack Hawke, lately Parliamentary Correspondent, The Daily Telegraph.
- Ernest Hayhurst, Regional Secretary (Yorkshire & North Midlands), Transport and General Workers' Union.
- John Douglas Hayhurst, Senior Principal Scientific Officer, Ministry of Technology.
- Harry Robert Haynes, MBE, Deputy General Secretary, National Farmers' Union.
- Richard Lewis Hearne. For services to handicapped children.
- William Frederick Charles Hill, General Secretary, Civil Air Transport Employers' Secretariat.
- Edward Wadsworth Hirst, Director, C. & J. Hirst & Sons Ltd, Huddersfield.
- William Edward Hogg, QPM, Deputy Chief Constable, Durham Constabulary.
- Edward Ernest Hollamby, Director of Development, London Borough of Lambeth.
- Joseph Barrington Holt, Staff Engineer, Telecommunications Headquarters, Post Office.
- Albert Howells, President, Pharmaceutical Society of Great Britain.
- James Hughes, chairman, Worcestershire Agricultural Executive Committee.
- Alan Ashby Jacka, Education Secretary, National Children's Home.
- Freeman Oliver Jayne, Director of Industrial Relations, National Federation of Building Trades Employers; Employers Secretary, National Joint Council for the Building Industry.
- David Thomas Jenkins, Headmaster, Holymead Junior School, Bristol.
- Ian McIlwraith Jennings. For services to Hill Farming in Scotland.
- Frances Drever-Jones, Director, Caernarvonshire Branch, British Red Cross Society.
- Isaiah Jones, chairman, Wellington Rural District Council.
- Trevor Palmer Jones, General Manager, Pershore Division, W. H. Allen, Sons & Company Ltd. For services to Export.
- Stanley Baldwin Kendrick, Senior Principal Scientific Officer, Ministry of Defence.
- Alderman Percival Cyril John Taylor Kirkman, chairman, City of Sheffield Local Savings Committee.
- Charles Eric Knight, Financial Director, South Western Electricity Board.
- Barry Pemberton Laight, Director, Hawker Siddeley Aviation Ltd. For services to Export.
- Stanley Lambert, QFSM, Chief Officer, City of Sheffield Fire Brigade.
- Gordon Arthur Edwin Laming, MM, Grade I Officer, Department of Employment and Productivity.
- Kenneth George Lampson, lately Commercial Director, Midland Group, British Steel Corporation.
- William Sidney Lanham, Member, National Savings Committee for Scotland.
- Robson Lathan, Chief Engineer, MV Dunstanburgh Castle, W. A. Souter & Company Ltd.
- Sir Thomas Richard Fiennes Barrett-Lennard, Bt., chairman, East Anglian Trustee Savings Bank.
- John Leonard, President, Amalgamated Union of Building Trade Workers.
- Arthur John Lewis. For services to Trawler Fishing at Fleetwood.
- Alix Liddell. For services to the Girl Guides Association.
- Alderman Joseph Liley. For local government services in Halifax.
- Martin Lovett, Cellist, Amadeus String Quartet.
- Janet Theodora Lusk, Director, The Guild of Service, Edinburgh.
- Alexander Lyall, MD, FRCS, Senior Consultant Surgeon, Greenock and District Hospitals.
- Patrick MacArthur, MD, FRCP, Consultant Paediatric Physician, Northern Regional Hospital Board, Scotland.
- Clifford Machin, Director, South Yorkshire Area, National Coal Board.
- Harold Bruce Macmillan, chairman, Derby and District Local Savings Committee.
- Joseph James Magrath. For services to road safety in Lincolnshire.
- Jessie Margaret Matthews, Actress.
- Brian Mertian Melland, Historian II, Cabinet Office.
- Maurice Arthur Michel, Head Teacher, Parklands County Primary Junior Mixed School, Leeds.
- Arthur Philip Monson, Chief Engineer, Radio Broadcasting, British Broadcasting Corporation.
- Henry Bevan Slator Montgomery, Senior Principal Scientific Officer, East Malling Research Station.
- Sir Edward Stanton Moore, Bt., Manager, Spain and Western Mediterranean, British European Airways.
- Trevor Albert Morgan, board member, Wales Gas Board.
- George Eric Borland Morrison, Higher Waterguard Superintendent, Board of Customs and Excise.
- John Richard Donald Morten, chairman, Derbyshire Agricultural Executive Committee.
- Guy Reginald Mountfort. For services to Ornithology.
- Siegmund Walter Nissel, Violinist, Amadeus String Quartet.
- John Gulland Osborne, lately chairman, Edinburgh Savings Bank.
- Douglas Geoffrey Owen, deputy chairman, Plastics Division, Imperial Chemical Industries Ltd.
- Colonel Henry Gary Owtram, TD, DL, chairman, Farnworth Local Employment Committee.
- Thomas Edward Parker, chairman, Royal Earlsvvood Hospital Management Committee.
- Lieutenant-Colonel Alfred Noel Patrick, TD, Member, Committee of Management and Honorary Treasurer, Institute of Cancer Research.
- John Russell Pearce. For services to the Thames Conservancy.
- Nyree Dawn Porter (Ngaire Dawn O'Leary), Actress.
- Philip Sugden Porter, chairman, Bolton and Leigh Supplementary Benefits Appeal Tribunal.
- Geoffrey Ivan Pout, Treasurer, British Overseas Airways Corporation.
- Thomas George Pruett, Director and General Manager, Thames Valley Traction Co. Ltd.
- Grace Rawlings, Consultant Clinical Psychologist, University College Hospital.
- Mildred Ansley Rawlinson. For services to the Church Assembly.
- Major Gerald Wilson Reside, MBE, ERD, DL, Member, Territorial, Auxiliary and Reserve Association for Northern Ireland.
- Stanley Charles Reynolds, Secretary, Newspaper Press Fund.
- Charles Peter Richards, chairman, Walsall Local Savings Committee.
- William John Stanley Richards, chairman, Carmarthenshire Agricultural Executive Committee.
- Arthur Whittaker Richardson, President, Rippingilles Ltd, Chairman of Council, Institute of Patentees and Inventors.
- Edward Alfred Rix, Engineer I, Ministry of Defence.
- Thomas Snowdon Robson, MBE, assistant director of Engineering, Independent Television Authority.
- Leonard Thomas Rouse, Senior Inspector of Taxes, Board of Inland Revenue.
- Stanley Arthur Rowe, chief executive officer, Board of Trade.
- William Edward Rowland, Grade I Officer, Department of Employment and Productivity.
- Ernest Colin-Russ, MRCS, LRCP, General Practitioner, London N.I. Chairman, Local Medical Committee, Inner London Executive Council.
- Arthur Leonard Henry Ryall, Head of Department of Commerce and Economics, Dudley College of Education.
- Peter Schidlof (Hans Schidlof), Violist, Amadeus String Quartet.
- Judith Dorothea Guillum Scott, Secretary, Council for the Care of Churches.
- Guy Hamilton Scoular, MB, ChB, Group Medical Superintendent, Northern and Southern Ayrshire Hospitals.
- Samuel Joseph Sherrard, lately County Inspector, Royal Ulster Constabulary.
- Paul Emanuel Shields, managing director, Dick & Goldschmidt Ltd. For services to Export.
- Nancy Diana Mary, Lady Shuckburgh, President, Warwickshire Branch, British Red Cross Society.
- Frederick John Sidwell, Technical Adviser, Ministry of Defence.
- Joshua Sieger, chairman and managing director, J. & S. Sieger Ltd. For services to Export.
- Colonel John Antoine Simons, DL. For services to the Magistracy in East Sussex.
- Andrew Smith, MB, BS, General Practitioner, Whickham, Newcastle upon Tyne.
- Sydney Frederick Smith, chairman, National Industrial Safety Committee, Royal Society for the Prevention of Accidents.
- William McGregor Smith, Chief Constable, Aberdeen City Police.
- John Hewitt Spencer, chairman, Cotton, Silk and Man-made Fibres Research Association, Shirley Institute. Chairman, John Spencer (Burnley) Ltd.
- Robert Ritchie Spink, Provost of Arbroath.
- Oscar State. For services to Sport.
- William Leonard Swain, President, Young, Austen & Young Ltd.
- George Bernard Swannell, Councillor, London Borough of Brent.
- John Sykes, Alderman, Huddersfield County Borough.
- Ernest Evans Tait, chairman, Borders Economic Planning Consultative Group.
- William Tait, Headmaster, Prudhoe County Secondary School, Prudhoe-on-Tyne, Northumberland.
- Lieutenant-Colonel William Raymond Taylor, MBE, TD, Chief Survey Officer, Ministry of Finance for Northern Ireland.
- Robert Gilman Terry, Director of Overseas Operations, Aberdare Group of Companies. For services to Export.
- Mansel Treharne Thomas. For services to Music in Wales.
- Sydney James Thompson, chairman, Northern Ireland Engineering Training Board, and managing director, J. Mackie & Sons.
- Captain Ronald Douglas Marett Tims, vice-president, The Officers' Association.
- Margaret Tyzack (Margaret Maud Stephenson), Actress.
- Joseph George Usher, Chief Clerk of the Companies Court, High Court of Justice.
- James Venus, managing director, Appledore Shipbuilders Ltd, Bideford, Devon.
- Stanley William Edward Vince, Principal Planner, Ministry of Housing and Local Government.
- Sydney Watson. For services to Music.
- Arthur James Wells, Managing Editor, The British National Bibliography.
- Edward George West, lately Director, Copper Development Association.
- Herbert Royle West, Principal Executive Officer, Department for National Savings.
- Derek John Whitehead, AFC, Chief Test Pilot, Hawker Siddeley Aviation Ltd, Brough, East Yorkshire.
- Cecil Titley Williams, Principal Accountant, Ministry of Public Building and Works.
- Dafydd Wyn Jones-Williams, MC, TD, Clerk of Merioneth County Council and Clerk of the Peace for Merioneth.
- Francis Norman Lloyd Williams, Head of School Broadcasting, Radio, British Broadcasting Corporation.
- Joseph Williams. For services to local government in Monmouthshire.
- Trevor Humphrey Williams, Deputy Assistant Commissioner, Metropolitan Police.
- Magnus Johnston Williamson. For services to Sporting Journalism in Scotland.
- Robert James Williamson. For services to local government in County Armagh.
- James Burns Wilson. For services to Sport in Scotland.
- Wishart Ingram Winchester, lately Chief Officer (Financial Research), British Railways Board.
- George Nigel Fancourt Wingate, DL, chairman, Cumberland and Westmorland Association of Boys' Clubs.
- David Francis Wiseman. For services to Association Football.
- Audrey Wood, General Secretary, Royal College of Midwives.
- Albert Ronald Wright, Group Sales Director, Lansing Bagnall Ltd. For services to Export.
- John Wright. For services to the community in East Kilbride.
- Frederick Robert Wylie, formerly Chief Consulting Architect, Scottish Industrial Estates Corporation.
- Frederick Archibald Young. For services to the British Film Industry.
- Donald David Zec. For services to Journalism.

Diplomatic Service and Overseas List

- Charles Oliver Adams, lately HM Consul, Cape Town.
- Robert Huntington Allen, DFC, lately Director of Telecommunications, Kuching, Sarawak.
- Harry Vivian Atkinson, JP. For services to the banana industry in St. Lucia.
- Geoffrey Robert Bide, Counsellor (Economic), HM Embassy, Brussels.
- Leo Borax, MBE, First Secretary and Consul, HM Embassy, Santiago.
- Leslie Denis Byrne, British Trade Commissioner, Edmonton, Canada.
- Alexander Peter Patrick George Campbell, General Manager, Sabah Rubber Fund Board.
- Derek George Cudmore, Assistant Resident Commissioner, Gilbert and Ellice Islands Colony.
- Claude Reynolds Devonshire, lately Chief Executive, Kenya Coffee and Marketing Board.
- John Di Vita. For services to British interests in Italy.
- Captain Michael Owen Eland, Principal Marine Officer, Selangor.
- Roger Talbot Eland, First Secretary (Information), HM Embassy, Tehran.
- Henry Robert Everett, TD. For services to the British community in Libya.
- William Charles Farr, lately Director of Department of Mass Communications, U.N.E.S.C.O., Paris.
- James George Milne Ferguson. For services to British interests in Malaysia.
- John Raymond Ford, Government Actuary, Prime Minister's Department, Kuala Lumpur.
- John Fowlie, QPM, Deputy Commissioner of Police, Swaziland.
- Ivy Fung Kan Sm-han, JP. For services to the community in Hong Kong.
- Major Richard Victor Goss, ED. For services to labour relations in the Falkland Islands.
- James Stanley Grant, lately managing director of the Agricultural Settlement Trust, Kenya.
- Peter James Gunter. For services to British interests in Kuwait.
- Michael Henry Knox Haggie, MC, MD, FRCP, lately Team Leader, Child Medical Care Unit, Enugu, Nigeria.
- Adam Hare. For services to the British community in Sylhet District, East Pakistan.
- Douglas James Harris, lately Professor (Head of Electrical Engineering), Ahmadu Bello University, Zaria, Nigeria.
- Thomas Ernest Hughes. For services to the British community in Benghazi.
- John David Hunter-Smith, Director of Agriculture, Swaziland.
- Joseph Luis Imossi, chairman, Gibraltar Shipping Association.
- Jeremiah Keohane, Commissioner of Prisons, Malawi.
- Anne Mary Kerins (Reverend Mother Mary Carmel). For welfare services in Gibraltar.
- Desmond Moore Kerr, Deputy British Government Representative, Castries.
- George Forbes Kinnear, lately First Secretary, HM Embassy, Kathmandu.
- Kenneth William Pearcy Kirton. For services to British interests in Jamaica.
- Iain Mackinnon. For services to British interests in India.
- Robert Murray Melville, MB, ChB, assistant director of Medical Services (Health), Kuching, Sarawak.
- Geoffrey Miles, First Secretary (Commercial), HM Embassy, Dublin.
- Eric Henry Morris, Manager, Dunlop (Thailand) Limited.
- Honor Olive Newell, MB, ChB, Principal of the Mission Hospital, Jiaganj, Murshidabad, West Bengal.
- Percy William James Newing, MBE, HM Consul (Commercial), Frankfurt.
- Harry Geoffrey Saunders Nicholls. For services to the coconut and sugar industries in Fiji.
- Jaime Nicholas Noguera. For services to the sugar industry in British Honduras.
- James Packman, lately Librarian, University of Ife, Nigeria.
- Bernard Albert Francis Pennock, lately Deputy British High Commissioner, Perth.
- Walter James Plumb, Director, Anglo-Mexican Institute, Mexico.
- Albert Hugh Reynolds. For services to the British community, Lisbon.
- Paul Scoon, Cabinet Secretary, Grenada. For services to education.
- Patrick John Seccombe, British Council Representative, Helsinki.
- Minnie Shaw, MBE. For services to the community in Palapye, Botswana.
- Dorian Cleophas Shillingford, MB, ChB, Chief Medical Officer, Dominica.
- Malcolm Robert John Snelling, MRCS, MRCP, Medical Superintendent, Lady Templer Hospital, Kuala Lumpur.
- The Reverend Geoffrey Lourey Speak. For services to education in Hong Kong.
- John Frederick Charles Springford, British Council Representative, Iraq.
- James John Talman, CD, Chief Librarian, University of Western Ontario, Canada.
- Colin William Tassie. For services to the British community in Chittagong, East Pakistan.
- McWelling Todman. For public services in the British Virgin Islands.
- Michael Milnes Townsend, MC, Assistant Resident Commissioner, New Hebrides.
- The Reverend Kenneth Hope Tyson, MBE. For services to the community in Lisbon.
- John Edmund Wade, ED. For public services in Montserrat.
- Harold Wardle, lately Accountant General, Hong Kong.
- Richard Norton Weir, MB, BCh, Specialist Anaesthetist, Queen Elizabeth II Hospital, Lesotho.
- Colonel Harry William George Williams, RCS, LRCP. For medical services with the Salvation Army in Southern India.
- John Edward Wyke, First Secretary, British High Commission, Rawalpindi.

State of New South Wales

- John Charles Allcot. For services to art.
- Allan Ernest Bax. For services to the community.
- Ivor Reginald Clark. For services to ex-servicemen.
- Brian Forster Dickens, MB, BS, of Dubbo. For services to the community.
- Frank Keith Duncan. For public services.
- Australia Hilda Florence Hart. For services to the community.
- Edwin Street. For services to charity.

State of Victoria

- Nola Isabel Constance Barber, of Aspendale. For services to local government and the community.
- Isabel Alice Green, of Kew. For services to the community.
- Theodore Cuyler Jarrett, of Portland. For services to local government and the community.
- Grevor Chilton Molyneux, of North Balwyn. For public services to hospitals and medical institutions.

State of Victoria

- Herbert Edward Towers, of Sandringham. For services to commerce and the community.
- Cornelius Peter Whelan, JP, of Donald. For services to local government and the community.

State of Queensland

- Councillor William Overend Garbutt, of Ingham. For services to local government and the community.
- Councillor Lesleigh George Windmell Smith, of Wondai. For services to local government and the community.
- Muriel Florence Wilson, of Bald Hills. For services to women's organisations.

State of South Australia

- Edith Adeline Casely, of Malvern. For social services.
- John Adam Horner, of Heathpool. For services to the arts.
- Marcus Gordon Jansen, MB, BS, of Orroroo. For services to medicine in country areas.
- Arthur Erwin Lange, of Nuriootpa. For services to local government and the community.

State of Western Australia

- Cecil Leonard Harvey, JP, of Cottesloe. For services to local government.
- The Right Reverend Thomas Brian Macdonald, Bishop of Perth. For services to education and the community.
- Kenneth McDougall, JP. For services to the agricultural industry.
- Albert Harold Telfer, I.S.O, JP. For public services.

State of Tasmania

- William Frank Ellis, Director, Queen Victoria Museum, Launceston.

==== Member of the Order of the British Empire (MBE) ====
Military Division

Royal Navy

- Lieutenant Commander (SD) (G) Jack Cann, (Retd.).
- Engineer Lieutenant (ME) Jack Feherty.
- First Officer Doris Graham, Women's Royal Naval Service.
- Lieutenant Commander (Sp) Leonard James Hayward, VRD, Royal Naval Reserve.
- Lieutenant Commander (SD) (O) Dennys Holroyd.
- Captain John Coryndon Luxmoore, Royal Marines.
- Wardmaster Lieutenant Leslie Massey.
- Lieutenant Commander (SD) (C) Edwin George Hugh Reubens, (Retd.).
- Lieutenant Commander Brian Angus Rutherford.
- Lieutenant Commander Antony Hugh Francis Wilks.

Army

- Captain (Quartermaster) Geoffrey John Banks (477058), The Parachute Regiment.
- Major Rodney Bowman Bashford (462065), Grenadier Guards.
- Major Frederick Peter Bettesworth (293215), The Royal Irish Rangers (27th (Inniskilling) 83rd and 87th).
- Major Bruce Osborne Bown (440283), Corps of Royal Engineers.
- The Reverend Thomas Bradley, Chaplain to the Forces 4th Class (481554), Royal Army Chaplains Department.
- Major Michael Matthew Bull (422231), Coldstream Guards.
- Captain Geoffrey Ernest Bysh (477925), Royal Army Ordnance Corps.
- Major John Currie Carruthers, TD, (224849), Royal Army Pay Corps Territorial and Army Volunteer Reserve, now R.A.R.O.
- 22280252 Warrant Officer Class I John Clayton, Royal Army Ordnance Corps.
- 19073352 Warrant Officer Class I Jack Derek Clayton, Royal Army Ordnance Corps.
- Major (acting) John Drennan (445297), Corps of Royal Electrical and Mechanical Engineers.
- 23249286 Warrant Officer Class II Norman Keith Fletcher, Royal Army Ordnance Corps.
- Major (Quartermaster) Douglas Harry Pattenden Fraser (467700), The Queen's Regiment.
- Major Hartley Ardagh Beresford Gahan (179838), The Light Infantry.
- Major Arthur James Alfred Gera (408089), Royal Malta Artillery.
- Major John Edmunds Norrie Giles (414858), The Parachute Regiment.
- Major (Quartermaster) Ronald Gordon (449874), Royal Corps of Transport.
- Major David Hancock (430314), The Light Infantry.
- 2829626 Warrant Officer Class I Colin Alastair Harper, The Royal Anglian Regiment.
- Major Michael Vincent Hayward (415786), The Queen's Regiment.
- Major (acting) Donald Edwin Head (197617), Army Cadet Force.
- W/361827 Warrant Officer Class II Lynnette Anna Elizabeth Hopkin, Women's Royal Army Corps.
- 6153863 Warrant Officer Class I Ronald Frank Horn, Royal Irish Rangers (27th (Inniskilling) 83rd and 87th).
- Major (Staff Quartermaster) Stanley Charles Ivatt, BEM, (363770), Royal Corps of Transport.
- Major James Stuart Lee (463227), Royal Army Educational Corps.
- Major (Staff Quartermaster) Trevor Henry Luscombe (256796), Royal Corps of Signals now R.A.R.O.
- Major (acting) James Andrew Patrick McDonough (356498), The King's Own Royal Border Regiment.
- 22256506 Warrant Officer Class II James Murray Malloch, The Argyll and Sutherland Highlanders (Princess Louise's).
- Major Robert Charles Manders, TD, (373459), Royal Army Ordnance Corps Territorial and Army Volunteer Reserve.
- Captain (acting) Ernest Mashiter (2675), Combined Cadet Force.
- Major Joseph Hubbard Milburn (433192), The King's Own Royal Border Regiment.
- Major Alec John Penney (463007), Royal Corps of Transport.
- 6355102 Warrant Officer Class I George Penny, Army Catering Corps.
- 2733926 Warrant Officer Class I Cyril Horace Phillips, Welsh Guards.
- Major Fawkes Norman Potts, TD, (87018), Royal Army Ordnance Corps, now retired.
- Major Frederick Terence Quelchwoolls (132965), Royal Corps of Transport now R.A.R.O.
- Major James Bryan Ray (390392), The Queen's Regiment.
- Major John Robert Robinson (430430), Royal Regiment of Artillery.
- Major Peter George Rosser (403671), Corps of Royal Engineers.
- 22561435 Warrant Officer Class I Ian Fraser Smith, Special Air Service Regiment.
- 2393246 Warrant Officer Class II Thomas Smith, Corps of Royal Electrical and Mechanical Engineers.
- Captain Donald Staples, TD, (475840), Royal Army Pay Corps, Territorial and Army Volunteer Reserve.
- 22289331 Warrant Officer Class II Thomas McKenzie Stoddart, Royal Corps of Signals.
- Captain (Quartermaster) George Frederick Taylor (472038), 17th/21st Lancers.
- Major Bernard Douglas Underwood (383576), Royal Corps of Transport.
- Major (Quartermaster) Royston Ivor Vallance, DCM, (459894), The Queen's Royal Irish Hussars.

Royal Air Force

- Squadron Leader Peter John Arthur (587901).
- Squadron Leader Thomas David Birtles, MB, ChB, (507791).
- Squadron Leader Ronald Blackburn (2496932).
- Squadron Leader Alan George Bridges (607552).
- Squadron Leader Dennis Sidney Eburne (51444).
- Squadron Leader Kenneth Fanthorpe (193198).
- Squadron Leader Graham Paul Fry (502401).
- Squadron Leader Brian Frederick Hills (58603).
- Squadron Leader Edward Albert Henry Hines (1715053).
- Squadron Leader Dennis King (3524861).
- Squadron Leader James William Peebles Kyle (4068747).
- Squadron Leader Edwin Thomas John Manning (584341).
- Squadron Leader Douglas Gordon Marr (506703), for services with the British Joint Services Training Team, Zambia.
- Squadron Leader Thomas Edward Welding (52169).
- Acting Squadron Leader James Hodgson (567637).
- Acting Squadron Leader James Reid Doig Paterson (1063265), RAF Volunteer Reserve (Training Branch).
- Flight Lieutenant Jack Neville Bishop (572570).
- Flight Lieutenant Arthur Brian Bullock (585021).
- Flight Lieutenant Frederick Douglas Cunningham (198883).
- Flight Lieutenant Alistair Ernest Knox (3525126).
- Flight Lieutenant Gordon James Tompkins (4054422).
- Flight Lieutenant Ronald Edgar Wakeford (655346), (Retd.).
- Warrant Officer Eric Bruin, BEM, (G0546148).
- Warrant Officer Reginald Thomas Dudley (L0909394).
- Warrant Officer Douglas Henry Gay (M0524228).
- Warrant Officer Thomas James Goodall (V4006418).
- Warrant Officer Jack Holt, BEM, (Q2267225).
- Warrant Officer Eric Hamilton Lloyd (D0573253).
- Warrant Officer Douglas Frederick Matthews (S0591801).
- Warrant Officer Francis Balleine Norman, BEM, (B2231738).
- Warrant Officer Robert Alexander Trimble (L0529942).
- Warrant Officer Nigel Gardner Watts (V0548723).
- Warrant Officer Basil Henry Wright, BEM, (AOS72773).

Civil Division

- James Adie, Works Manager, J. H. Carruthers Ltd. For services to Export.
- Alan Armer Alcorn, chairman, Clogher Valley Savings Committee, County Tyrone.
- George John Allen, Higher Executive Officer, Home Office.
- Annie Anderson, MB, ChB, General Medical Practitioner, Old Meldrum, Aberdeenshire.
- Donald Frederick Andrews, Secretary, Canterbury Farmers' Club and East Kent Chamber of Agriculture.
- Alan George Angus, Grade 3 Officer, Department of Employment and Productivity.
- Michael Henry Armstrong, DL, formerly District Commandant, Ulster Special Constabulary.
- Arthur Archie Arnell, lately Head Postmaster, Rugby.
- Dorothy Susannah Ashurst, Senior Executive Officer, Department of Health and Social Security.
- Charles Ashworth, Regional Collector, Board of Inland Revenue.
- Maurice Bailey, lately Deputy Chief Officer, West Riding of Yorkshire Fire Brigade.
- William George Baker, Contracts Manager, E. Turner & Sons Ltd, Cardiff.
- Joan Winifred Balls, Senior Executive Officer, Ministry of Overseas Development.
- Edward Thomas Bannister, National Cycling Organiser, Royal Society for the Prevention of Accidents.
- William Raymond Barlow, Chief Officer, Doncaster Fire Brigade.
- Lillian Bessie Barnard, Vice-chairman, Park Prewett Hospital Management Committee, Southampton.
- Winifred Mary Barnes, Secretary to the Chief Constable, Sheffield and Rotherham Constabulary.
- William Bate, Chief Public Health Inspector, Cardiff.
- James Bathgate, Inspector of Taxes (Higher Grade), Board of Inland Revenue.
- Charles William Baxter, Area Manager, Assembly, Manufacturing Division, Perkins Engines Ltd. For services to Export.
- Keith Lester Beak, Mechanical and Electrical Engineer Main Grade, HM Stationery Office.
- Francis Arthur Bearcroft, an Export Manager, Ilford Ltd. For services to Export.
- Henry Bell, Purser, SS Esso Mercia, Esso Petroleum Co. Ltd.
- Joseph Herbert Benn, Senior Executive Officer, Department of Health and Social Security.
- Frederick Betty. For services to the community and especially the youth of Bridgwater.
- Stanley Charles Bignell, Senior Information Officer, Central Office of Information.
- Ruby Mildred Blake, Organiser of Training for the Mentally Handicapped, Cornwall.
- Reginald Henry Bleaden, District Traffic Superintendent, Bristol Company Buses.
- Ronald William Sedgwick Bradman, Senior Executive Officer, Ministry of Technology.
- Beryl Brelsford, Representative for North East Derbyshire on Regional Street, Village and Social Groups Savings Committee.
- Ernest Arthur Bridge, Group Personnel Manager, Thorn Electrical Industries Ltd.
- Ernest Arthur Brown, Divisional Organiser, Amalgamated Union of Engineering and Foundry Workers.
- George Ernest Brown, Grade 4 Officer, Department of Employment and Productivity.
- Dorothy Evelyn Browne. For services to handicapped people in Northern Ireland.
- James Bruce, Horticulturist, Scotland.
- James Bethune Bruce, lately Project Site Manager, G. N. Haden & Sons Ltd.
- Winifred Alison Bryan, District Nurse and Midwife, Cley district, Norfolk.
- Stanley Norman Burfield, managing director, Burfield & Company (Gloves) Ltd, Martock, Somerset. For services to Export.
- Sydney George Burrows, Surveyor, Board of Customs and Excise.
- Gerald Bush, Higher Executive Officer, Board of Inland Revenue.
- Richard Byars, Honorary Secretary and Treasurer, Forfar and District Local Savings Committee.
- Anna Bella Calder, Member, Central Council for Scotland, Scottish Women's Rural Institutes.
- Albert Edward Calver. For services to agriculture and agricultural workers.
- George Albert Carlton, Senior Administrative Officer, St. Luke's College, Exeter.
- Hephzibah Caroline Carman, lately Member, West Sussex County Council.
- Louis Thomas Lovett Carne, Legal Executive, Peacock & Goddard, Solicitors, London.
- James Spencer Cartlidge, Mechanical and Electrical Engineer (Rolling Stock Maintenance), Southern Region, British Railways Board.
- Arthur Edward Caswell, lately Experimental Officer, Ministry of Defence.
- John Richard Cater, Clerical Officer, Ministry of Defence.
- Gerald Bowerman Chaffe, Member of Management Executive, Viyella International Ltd. For services to Export.
- Florence Anne Cheeseman, Grade 5 Officer, Department of Employment and Productivity.
- Chong Kee Cheng, Executive Officer, Hong Kong, Ministry of Defence.
- William Christie, formerly District Commandant, Ulster Special Constabulary.
- Reginald Clark, Secretary, East Midlands Regional Advisory Committee, Trades Union Congress.
- Sidney Charles Clarke, Councillor, Luton Rural District Council.
- Donald Clayton, Engineering Manager, Vickers Ltd, Shipbuilding Group, Barrow-in-Furness.
- William Clayton, Mill Manager, Texas Mill, Lancashire Cotton Corporation.
- Kate Clements, Clerical Assistant, Ministry of Defence.
- Horace Arthur Cole, Honorary Secretary, Dulwich Sea Cadet Corps Unit Committee.
- Marjorie Coleman, Honorary Secretary, Colchester Service Division, Soldiers', Sailors' and Airmen's Families Association.
- Johanna Collock, Matron, female wards, Moss Side Hospital, Department of Health and Social Security.
- Amos Wilfrid Constant, Foreign and Commonwealth Office.
- Eric Howard Cook, Group Manager, Midland Region, Central Electricity Generating Board.
- Adeline Muriel Cooke, Ward Sister, Geriatric Ward, Whittington Hospital, London.
- Albert Coupe, Industrial Relations Manager, Rootes Motors Ltd.
- Mary Coventry, General Secretary, National Union of Railwaymen, Women's Guild.
- Anthony John Carew Cox, managing director, Cox Exhibition Consultants Ltd. For services to Export.
- Helen Sophia Cox, Headmistress, Glendoick Primary School, Perth.
- Charles Meakin Coxon, Station Manager, Paddington, Western Region, British Railways Board.
- James Williams Craig, Deputy Principal, Ministry of Education for Northern Ireland.
- Hubert Frank Cresswell. For services to Music in Ayrshire.
- William George James Cripps, Manager, Naval Department, Evershed & Vignoles, Chiswick.
- Harry Hector Cross, lately Employment Officer, Normanby Park Steel Works, British Steel Corporation.
- Olive Mary Crouch, Assistant Publicity Officer, Port of Bristol Authority.
- Herbert Sydney Croyden, lately Senior Representative, Church Army, B.A.O.R.
- John Noel Cruttenden, Chief Superintendent, Kent County Constabulary.
- Geraldine Cully, Executive Officer, Association of Commonwealth Universities.
- Aaron Currie. For services to Swimming in Northern Ireland.
- William Currie, Councillor, Banff County Council.
- William John Currie. For services to the welfare of the elderly in East Belfast.
- Ceinwen Mary Davies, Headmistress, Halfway Infants School, Llanelli.
- Francis Richard Davies, Commander, Metropolitan Police.
- Horace George Davy, General Manager and Secretary, Chamber of Shipping of the United Kingdom.
- Joseph Denham, Superintendent, Production Shops, Scottish Aviation Ltd. For services to Export.
- John Robert Brown Dennett, Chief Draughtsman, Ordnance Survey Department, Ministry of Housing and Local Government.
- George Vernon Dent, Regional Secretary, Country Landowners' Association.
- Lavinia Derwent, Author.
- Edward Albert Rust-D'Eye, Telecommunications Technical Officer, Ministry of Defence.
- Samuel Edgar Dickason, Chief Office Clerk, House of Commons Library.
- Robert Douglas Dickson, chairman, Wigan Local Savings Committee.
- John Dixon, Member, Gretna State Management District Local Advisory Committee.
- Lewis Dixon, Senior Probation Officer, Yorkshire (North Riding) Probation and After-Care Service.
- Thomas Alfred Drabble, Actuary, Trustee Savings Bank, Lincoln.
- Leslie Blakey Duckworth, lately Assistant to Editor, Birmingham Post.
- Vincent James Todd Kirkwood Dunlop, General Secretary, Northern Ireland Association of Boys' Clubs.
- Malcolm Dobson Edington, Consultant (Coking Group), Coal Products Division, National Coal Board.
- Herbert Leeson Edlin, District (Forest) Officer Grade I, Forestry Commission.
- Vernon Walter Eldred, Research Manager, Fuel Element Metallurgy Group, Research Development Laboratory, United Kingdom Atomic Energy Authority.
- David Evans, chairman and Founder, League of Friends of Cossham Hospital, Bristol.
- Edith Cecily Evans, Assistant Branch Director, Nottinghamshire Branch, British Red Cross Society.
- Ieuan Evans, lately Clerk of the Trowbridge Urban District Council.
- Stanley Fred Everiss, Head, Biological Science Department, Paddington Technical College.
- Gerald Eyre, DFC, Head, Department of Liberal Studies, Peterborough Technical College.
- Crawford William Fairbrother. For services to Athletics.
- Ernest George Faregrave, chairman, London Regional National Savings Education Committee.
- George William Fisher, Chief Superintendent, Bristol Constabulary.
- Ernest Lubbock Fiske, Trawling Skipper, Lowestoft.
- Norman Summerfield Fitter, Joint Managing Director, Fitter & Sons Ltd, Birmingham.
- Roy Arthur Flood, deputy director, Books Department, British Council.
- Kathleen Vera Friend, Secretary, British Ship Adoption Society.
- Marjorie Emme Fryer, Head Teacher, Springdale Junior School, Wolverhampton.
- Richard Ernest George Gillis, Director of Purchasing, Goodyear Tyre & Rubber Company (Great Britain) Ltd.
- Alfred Thomas James Goddard, DL. For services to the community in Sunbury and district.
- Anatol Goldberg, Chief Scriptwriter, East European Service, British Broadcasting Corporation.
- Michael Felix Grant, lately Senior Executive Officer, Ministry of Agriculture, Fisheries and Food.
- Violet Isabelle Whitworth Green, Senior Executive Officer, Board of Trade.
- Geoffrey Gunney. For services to Rugby League Football.
- Thomas Hall, Main Grade Mechanical and Electrical Engineer, Ministry of Public Building and Works.
- Dorothy Mackenzie Harper, Councillor, Rotherwick Parish Council.
- Robert William Henry Harris, Station Engineer, East Greenwich Works, South Eastern Gas Board.
- James George Hartshorn, Clerical Officer, Science Research Council.
- Francis Vivian Harty, lately chairman, Finance Committee, South Down Hospitals Group, County Down.
- Jack Hatchett, Joint Managing Director, British Piano Actions Ltd, Llanelli, Carmarthenshire. For services to Export.
- Robert Edwin Hay. For services to the British Tourist Authority.
- William Norman Hay, Group Secretary and Treasurer, St. Francis and The Lady Chichester Hospital Management Committee, Sussex.
- William Stephen McElroy Hayes, Radio Officer, MV Inverleith, Christian Salvesen & Co. Ltd.
- Henry Frederick Alfred Heath, Secretary, Constables Branch Board, Police Federation of England and Wales.
- Rodger Heath, Higher Executive Officer, Department of Health and Social Security.
- Leslie Richard Heathcote, Councillor, South East Derbyshire Rural District Council.
- John Heaton, Higher Executive Officer, Department of Health and Social Security.
- Rita Bernherdina Hebditch, Headmistress, Braeburn Infants School, Scarborough.
- Robert Hepburn. For services to Scottish Fisheries.
- Hilda Rosamond Hepworth. For services to Ski-racing.
- James Bailey Herd, chairman, Aberdeen, Banff and Kincardine War Pensions Committee.
- Eileen Linda Hibburt, Superintendent of Typists, Agricultural Research Council.
- George Harold Hill, lately General Manager, Entertainments Department, Eastbourne.
- Annie Jane Ladysmith Hills. For services to Music and Drama in the Garw Valley.
- John Holgate. For services to Music in Bradford.
- Percival Thomas Holl, Senior Executive Officer, Department of Health and Social Security.
- James Holmes, Clerical Officer, Department for National Savings.
- Kathleen Holt, Executive Officer, Ministry of Defence.
- Frank Housley, District Organiser, Transport and General Workers' Union (Plasterers Section).
- Captain William Martin Houston, Master, MV Moyle, General Service Contracts.
- Albert Edward Howard, Chief Superintendent, Staffordshire County and Stoke-on-Trent Constabulary.
- Ian Alexander Howie, chairman and Joint Managing Director, Merrydown Wine Company Ltd, Horam, Sussex. For services to Export.
- Leslie Polan Huggett, Head of Chemistry Department, Shoe and Allied Trades Research Association. For services to Export.
- Mona Hughes, Clerical Officer, Department of Education and Science.
- Rosemary Ethel Hume, chairman, The Cordon Bleu Cookery School.
- Violet Maud Hutchings, Assistant Branch Director, Dorset Branch, British Red Cross Society.
- David James, Honorary Secretary, Nantyglo and Blaina Local Savings Committee.
- Matthew Johnston, Engineer-in-charge, Post Office Radio Station, Baldock.
- Agnes Jane Cadvan-Jones. For services to the community in Blaenau Ffestiniog.
- Alfred Ernest Jones, chairman, Torbay Local Savings Committee.
- John William Jones, President, National Executive Committee, British Iron, Steel and Kindred Trades Association.
- Trevor Jones, Inspector of Taxes (Higher Grade), Board of Inland Revenue.
- Valerie Jones, Head Occupational Therapist, Llanfrechfa Grange Hospital, Cwmbran.
- Anthony Derek Jordan. For services to Badminton.
- Delia Joyce, Alderman, St. Austell with Fowey Borough Council.
- Mary Ann Joyce, lately Matron, Highfield Hostel, Sunderland.
- Christina Macnair Keachie, lately Superintendent of Health Visitors, Glasgow Corporation.
- Walter James Keene, chairman, Coventry Local Savings Committee.
- Robert Keers, Group Engineer (Construction), Durham County Council.
- Joseph Kelly, Honorary Secretary, Doncaster Industrial Savings Committee.
- Samuel Kennedy, Principal Process Supervisor, Chemical Plants, Springfields Works, United Kingdom Atomic Energy Authority.
- Helen Lolita Kingston, lately Home Teacher for the Blind, East Ham.
- Cyril Kirby, Assistant Supplies Officer, British Waterways Board, Leeds.
- Albert Knight, chairman, Chester and District Local Advisory Committee.
- Thomas Earle-Knight, formerly Chief Engineer, Pinewood Studios.
- Philip Charles Knights, Senior Executive Officer, Crown Agents Representative in West Africa.
- Kathleen Laurenson, lately Home Teacher for the Blind, Wellingborough.
- Doris Leary, Honorary Secretary, Rickmansworth and Chorleywood Local Savings Committee.
- Phyllis Mary Ledger, Higher Executive Officer, Ministry of Transport.
- Thomas Hilton Leivers, Councillor, Arnold Urban District Council.
- George Edward Lloyd, Divisional Officer Grade I, London Fire Brigade.
- Kingsley Longstaff, Clerk of the Castle Ward Rural District Council.
- Cyril Vincent McCann, Senior Conservation Officer, Imperial War Museum.
- Hazel Mace, President, National Association of Certificated Nursery Nurses.
- William McEwen, Deputy Manager and Plant Superintendent, Rocket Motor Propellant and Production Department, Summerfield Research Station, Imperial Metal Industries Ltd.
- John James McFarland, MM, chairman, Enniskillen Branch, British Legion.
- Edgar Walwin Macfarlane, deputy chairman, Scottish Committee, British Sailors' Society.
- Evan MacGillivray, County Librarian, Orkney.
- John William McGowan, Works Superintendent, A. Reyrolle & Company Ltd, Ashington, Northumberland.
- Victor Borton Mack McLeonard, Air Traffic Control Officer Grade II, Board of Trade.
- Doris Clara Mann, Honorary Secretary, Eastern Area, Freight Transport Association Ltd.
- Reginald Peter Mantle, Senior Special Facilities Officer, British European Airways.
- Anthony Joseph Mascari, MD, Area Commissioner, City of Nottingham Area, St. John Ambulance Association and Brigade.
- Anne Elizabeth Mason, lately Matron, St. Peter's Hospital, Bourne, Lincolnshire.
- Leonard Patrick Matthews, Secretary, British Food Export Council. For services to Export.
- George Luckley Maughan, Chief Warning Officer, Bedford Group, United Kingdom Warning and Monitoring Organisation.
- Thomas Blackburn Mawdsley, Head, Textile Development Engineering Department, Filament Weaving Division, Carrington & Dewhurst Ltd.
- Mildred Maxwell, Principal Nursing Officer (Midwifery Division), East Birmingham Group of Hospitals.
- Walter Charles Mayhew, County Staff Officer for Cadets, Suffolk, St. John's Ambulance.
- Stanley Thomas Edward Mellor. For services to Horse Racing.
- Gwendoline Madge Metcalfe, Clerical Officer, Ministry of Transport.
- George Milligan, Group Building Supervisor, Central Lanarkshire Hospitals.
- John Alexander Mills, Inspector of Engineering, Board of Inland Revenue.
- Agnes Ramsay Christina Mitchell, lately Governor, East Sutton Park Borstal.
- Harry Mitchell, Commander, Metropolitan Police.
- Alexander Leathley Morgan, Higher Executive Officer, Department of Health and Social Security.
- Florence Emily Morkam, School Meals Officer, Surrey County Council.
- Ian Morrison, Airport Manager, Prestwick, British Overseas Airways Corporation.
- Jenny Ritchie Morrison, Teacher, House Mistress, Smithycroft Secondary School, Glasgow.
- Bertha Margaret Morton, lately Deputy Headmistress, Canonbury Junior School, Islington.
- Mary Caroline Murphy, Superintendent Radiographer, Battle Hospital, Reading.
- Evan Duncan Murray, lately chairman, Scottish Pipework Engineering and Allied Training Group.
- Margaret Milne Mutch, Ward Sister, Royal Victoria Hospital, Edinburgh.
- Margaret Naderer (Sister Murphy), Theatre Superintendent, Hope Hospital, Salford.
- Gladys May Needham, Personal Assistant to the Vice-Chancellor, City University.
- Ernest Edward Newton, Headmaster, St. Peter's Church of England Primary School, Everton.
- Albert Edward Nunn, Area Agent, W. Snape & Sons Ltd, Eccles, Manchester.
- William Patrick O'Kane, Assistant Head Postmaster, Londonderry.
- William John Overy, Naval Resettlement Information Officer, Ministry of Defence.
- Hilda Gertrude Pacey, Registrar of Births, Deaths and Marriages, Birmingham.
- George Henry Parker, chairman, Electrical Engineers (Association of Supervisory Electrical Engineers) Exhibition Ltd. For services to Export.
- William Pate, Provost of Galashiels.
- Francis Henry Peck, Superintendent Clerk of Works, Housing Department, Greater London Council.
- Arthur Thomas Pegg, Superintendent, Brooklands Remand Home for Boys, Somerset.
- Albert Henry Pegley, Deputy Chief Male Nurse, South Ockendon Hospital.
- David Arthur Perris, Secretary, Midlands Regional Advisory Committee, Trades Union Congress.
- Florence May Phelps, President and chairman, Southampton District, Hampshire Branch, British Red Cross Society.
- Leslie Thomas Pierce, managing director, Liverpool United Warehouse-Keepers' Association.
- George D'Alton Prichard, Manager, Information Services Department, Hirst Research Centre, General Electric and English Electric Companies Ltd.
- Cyril Egerton Procter, Road Safety Officer, Wallasey Corporation.
- Major Keith Proctor, Works Officer, Anzac Agency for the Pacific Region, Commonwealth War Graves Commission.
- Hugh Herbert Pryce, Headmaster, Deepdale County Junior School, Preston.
- Madeline Mary Punch, Matron, Danetre Hospital, Daventry.
- Joseph William Raine, Member, Cumberland Agricultural Executive Committee.
- Sylvia Rawes, Matron, Beaumont Hospital, Lancaster.
- Eileen Muriel Rawlins, Honorary Secretary, Dover and District Local Savings Committee.
- Charles William Reed, chairman, Hammersmith, Kensington and Chelsea Social Security Local Advisory Committee.
- Brinley Rees, District Secretary, Transport and General Workers' Union.
- Hilda Anne Rees. For services to the education of maladjusted children in Birmingham.
- Patrick Reihill. For services to local government in County Fermanagh.
- Geoffrey Powell Richards, Project Manager, Elliott Flight Automation Ltd. For services to Export.
- Thomas Rickett, Senior Information Officer, National Economic Development Office.
- John Kent Ridler, lately Member, Somerset Agricultural Executive Committee.
- Arnold Kirk Roberts, Industrial Adviser, British Textile Employers Association.
- Desmond Julian Roberts, Senior Civil Engineer, Ministry of Public Building and Works.
- Douglas Arthur Robinson, MC, Technical Director, Road Surface Dressing Association.
- Roland Kibble Robinson, Manager, Overseas Manufacturing Division, British Leyland Motor Corporation Ltd. For services to Export.
- Ellen Brown Rutherford, Deaconess and Sunday School Organiser, Church of Scotland.
- Leslie Arthur Savigar, Higher Executive Officer, Ministry of Technology.
- James Melville Scoble, Councillor, Truro Rural District Council.
- Hilda Mary Scourse. For services at St. George's Garrison Church, Bulford Camp, Wiltshire.
- Michael John Frazer Secretan, chairman and managing director, Hucknall Manufacturing Company Ltd. For services to Export.
- George Frederick Sedgwick, District Secretary, Workers' Educational Association, Yorkshire (North) District.
- Teresa Beryl Pedgrift Sexton, Senior Executive Officer, Nature Conservancy.
- Thomas Shepherd, formerly Project Leader, Bahrain Earth Station, Cable & Wireless
- Frederick Stanton Short, chairman, Chesterfield and District Social Security Local Advisory Committee.
- Frank Shuttleworth, Senior Experimental Officer, Warren Spring Laboratory, Ministry of Technology.
- Frederick Signey, chairman, Newcastle upon Tyne Local Savings Committee.
- Thomas Liddell Sixt, Group Engineer, West Cornwall Hospital Management Committee.
- Rachel Helene Slater, Personal Assistant to the managing director, P. & C. Garnett Ltd. For services to Export.
- Mary Vianna Slim, Manageress, Whitehall Luncheon Club.
- Thomas Gerard Sloan, Tutor Organiser, HM Prison Wormwood Scrubs.
- Marie Tapscott Slocombe, Librarian, Sound Archives, British Broadcasting Corporation.
- William Owen Sloman, Personnel Officer, British Antarctic Survey.
- Elsie Margaret Adele Smith, Personal Secretary, Ministry of Defence.
- Kenneth Smith, Grade 3 Officer, Department of Employment and Productivity.
- Norman Smith, Chief Forester, Rheola Forest, Wales, Forestry Commission.
- Roy Denys Smith, Traffic Superintendent (Buses), London Transport Executive.
- Barbara Smyth, Editorial Assistant, British Journal of Nutrition.
- Elizabeth Spittal, Depute Director of Planning, Renfrewshire.
- Frederick William Stagg, Pest Control Officer, London Borough of Kingston.
- Stephen Standen, lately Senior Clerk, County Courts Branch, Lord Chancellor's Department.
- Arthur Herbert Staughton, ERD, Senior Information Officer, Ministry of Defence.
- Beatrice Mary Stratton, General Secretary, Leeds Council of Social Service.
- Frederick Arthur Stroudley, Higher Clerical Officer, Metropolitan Police Office.
- Shirley Dyson Sutcliffe, Head Teacher, St. Michael's Immigrant Education Centre, Bradford.
- Margaret Christine Swallow, chairman, Grimsby and District Disablement Advisory Committee.
- Doris Marjorie Sym, Principal, Glasgow School of Occupational Therapy.
- Agnes Lowrie Thomson Taylor, Member, Committee of Central Training Council.
- John Alfred Taylor, Principal Engineer, Sperry Gyroscope Division, Sperry Rand Ltd.
- William Teasdale. Fell-runner, for services to Athletics.
- Alexander Forbes Thacker, Senior Executive Officer, Department of Health and Social Security.
- Mabel Thomas, Clerical Officer, Ministry of Defence.
- Ursula Kathleen Thomas. For services to the welfare of the sick and elderly in Letchworth and district.
- William George Thomas. For social and local government services in Cwmbran and district, Monmouthshire.
- Harry Waterfield Thompson, Mill Manager, J. & J. Hayes, Leigh, Lancashire.
- Frank Thornton, Councillor, Shipley Urban District Council.
- John Thorpe. For services to local government in Sheffield.
- Thomas Clifford Threlfall, Senior Executive Officer, Department of Health and Social Security.
- Albert Tierney, Cashier, Independent Television Authority.
- Edward Brown Toogood, Works Administration Manager, Hurn Works, British Aircraft Corporation. For services to Export.
- Sydney Ronald Turner, Chief Accountant, General Dental Council.
- Anne Alexandra Usmar, County Organiser, Lincolnshire and Holland, Women's Royal Voluntary Service.
- Maureen Wadsworth, Secretary to the Permanent Secretary, Supreme Court of Judicature of Northern Ireland.
- Albert Edward Walker, Shipbuilding Manager (Wallsend), Swan Hunter & Tyne Shipbuilders Ltd. For services to Export.
- Vera Constance Wall, County Organiser, West Sussex, Women's Royal Voluntary Service.
- Flight Lieutenant John Wallace, MM, Member, No. 1739 (Second Midlothian) Squadron, Air Training Corps.
- Fred Walsh, chairman, Blackburn and District Local Savings Committee.
- Evelyn Watson, Member of Northumberland Executive Council.
- Thomas Henry George Wenham, Manager, Thame Terminal, Shell-Mex & B.P. Ltd.
- Alan George Westland, Inspector of Warnings (Scotland), United Kingdom Warning and Monitoring Organisation.
- Dora Jessie Whale, Map Librarian, Ministry of Housing and Local Government.
- Eric Neville Wheeler, Clerk of the St. Albans Rural District Council.
- Phyllis Agnes Wiener, lately Social Worker, National Corporation for the Care of Old People.
- Alfred Francis Wilkes, lately Chief Administrator and Financial Officer, County Surveyor's Department, Worcestershire County Council.
- Joseph Holt Williams, Inspector of Taxes (Higher Grade), Board of Inland Revenue.
- Kathleen Mary Williams, Higher Executive Officer, Ministry of Defence.
- Silas Williams, Quality Control Superintendent, Hoovers Ltd, Merthyr Tydfil. For services to Export.
- Stanley Charles Williams, Senior Pilot, London, Trinity House.
- Sybil Williams, Executive Officer, Ministry of Agriculture, Fisheries and Food.
- Joseph Henry Williamson, County Welfare Officer, County Armagh.
- John Wilson, Principal Careers Officer, Leicestershire.
- Norman Robert Johnston Wilson, chairman, Omagh Urban District Council.
- Stanley Wilson, Actuary, Devon and Exeter Savings Bank.
- Arthur Francis Wishart, Superintending Instructor Grade A, Ministry of Defence.
- Samuel Woodward. For services to the Archway Shelter, Ardwick, Manchester.
- Blanche Ruth Woollhead, Higher Executive Officer, Department of Health and Social Security.
- Yvonne Mary Frances Rose Wyatt, Superintendent, Field Place Home for Handicapped Children, New Milton, Hampshire.
- Frank Wycherley, Councillor, North Shropshire Rural District Council.
- William Wylde, Site Agent, Sir Robert Lloyd & Company Ltd, Bromborough, Cheshire.
- Gerard Hugh de Burgh Wyllys, lately chairman, Wessex Trustee Savings Bank.
- Barbara Joyce Wyvill, Senior Executive Officer, Department for National Savings.
- Henry Yates, Deputy Co-ordinator, No. 1 Regional Crime Squad.
- John William Neville Yeomans, Chief Engineer, Redifon Air Trainers Ltd, Aylesbury. For services to Export.
- Sylvia Louisa Martha Jacqueline Yule, Senior Mistress, Tal Handaq Secondary Comprehensive School, Malta, Ministry of Defence.
- Olga Zappelloni, lately District Nurse and Midwife, Hereford.

Diplomatic Service and Overseas List

- Thomas Henry Abraham, British Vice-Consul (Commercial), Gothenburg.
- Jonathan Vincent Alves, Permanent Secretary, Ministry of Home Affairs, St. Vincent.
- Inez Muriel Andrews. For services to the community in Bermuda.
- Wilfred Gordon Angus. For services to British interests in Greece.
- John Richard Ansell, Third Secretary, HM Embassy, Mogadishu.
- Jack Laurence Arnold, District Commissioner, Malawi.
- Helen Hugo Barrett. For services to nursing in the British Solomon Islands Protectorate.
- Cecil Thomas James Basterfield, Grade 9 Officer, HM Embassy, Paris.
- Joseph Charles Ogilvie Berlouis, Welfare Officer, Seychelles.
- Cyril George Biddle, Commercial Officer, British High Commission, Montreal.
- Judith Ann Bird, Shorthand Typist, British High Commission, Kuala Lumpur.
- William Ronald Somerville Bond, Honorary British Vice-Consul, Montreux.
- Captain David Tremain Brown, Director of Marine, Singapore.
- Harold Phillip Clive Burton, Agricultural Assistant (Cocoa Propagation), Agricultural Department, Dominica.
- Kenneth George Catton, lately Chief Inspector, Kenya Police Force.
- Edward Anna Ceulemans, lately Acting Chief Superintendent, Nigeria Police Force,
- David Robinson Cockbaine, British Technical Assistance Officer, Turkey.
- Henry Douglas Gordon Coffin, Senior Personnel Officer, Ministry of Health, Malawi.
- Henry Edward Melville Crofton, Senior Assistant Secretary, Development Division, President's Office, Malawi.
- Mary Augherton Currie, Head of Passport Section, British High Commission, Toronto.
- John Robert Deverell, Administrative Officer Class IIA, Fiji.
- Louis Phillip Evelyn, Agricultural Officer, Nevis.
- Elsie Sophia Farmer, Grade 9 Officer, United Kingdom Mission to the United Nations, New York.
- Bregado Flax, Customs Officer, British Virgin Islands.
- Cyril Jose Frazier, lately Superintendent, Nigeria Police Force.
- Gwendoline Maude French. For services to the Girl Guides Association in the Bahama Islands.
- Marjory Eleanor Fyson, lately Principal, Sunrise School for the Blind, Lahore.
- Arthur Harrison Gibson, Farm Machinery Engineer, Ministry of Agriculture, Lesotho.
- Luther Edward Gill, Consular Clerk, HM Embassy, Cuba.
- Peter Gill, First Secretary, British High Commission, Lusaka.
- Norman Gerard Glynn, lately Agricultural Officer, Ministry of Agriculture, Kenya.
- Joan Ehretia Windus Gordon. For services to the British community in New York.
- Chester Randolph Hall, Road Superintendent, Public Works Department, British Honduras.
- Harold Halliwell, HM Consul, Kuwait.
- Cyril Hampton, Second Secretary and HM Vice-Consul, Madrid.
- Esa Joseph Hazou, British Vice-Consul, Tunis.
- Courtenay Leatham Humphrys, lately Assistant Commissioner (Head of Special Branch), Lesotho Mounted Police.
- Jean Margaret Ingles, Senior Personal Secretary, Hong Kong.
- Edmond Ip Wing-cheong. For services to the community in Hong Kong.
- Samuel Ormond Jack. For services to the community in St. Vincent.
- Mary Violet Anne Johnson. For educational and welfare services in Kenya.
- Allen Jones. For relief work in Nigeria.
- Dora Katzler. For services to the community in Nairobi.
- Peter James Kirchner, lately Second Secretary (Immigration), British High Commission, Nairobi.
- Cyril Edgar Goodwin Trinder Kirk. For services to British interests in Brazil.
- Ilma Lewis. For services to the British community in Montevideo.
- Phyllis Marjorie Lintott, Assistant, Reference Division, British Information Services, New York.
- Lucille Arlington Lorde. For services to the community in St. Lucia.
- John Walter Lowe, lately British Technical Assistance Officer in Colombia.
- Margaret Edel Luckham, lately Librarian, Ministry of Agriculture, Kenya.
- May Yolande Louise McDonald. For services to the Girl Guide movement in Antigua.
- Daniel Mackay, Government Printer, Botswana.
- Kenneth Osborn Martin, Senior Engineer (Buildings), Public Works Department, Swaziland.
- Marion Emma Norwood Young, Librarian, British Consulate-General, Johannesburg.
- Ronald Frederick Ockwell. For relief work in Nigeria.
- Rota Onorio, English Instructor, Merchant Marine Training School, Gilbert and Ellice Islands Colony.
- George Ernest Peel, Consular Clerk, British Consulate, Santos, Brazil.
- Lilavati Cornelia Ram Samuj, Senior Health Sister, Suva Health Office, Fiji.
- Patricia Anne Rigge. For services to the British community in Madrid.
- Jean Florence Ringe, lately Head Nurse, Save the Children Fund Centre, Qui Nhơn, Viet-Nam.
- George Cecil Rymer. For services to agriculture in the British Virgin Islands.
- Douglas Herbert Allenby Scholey, lately Engineer-in-Chief, East African Posts and Telegraphs Corporation.
- Silas Sitai, BEM, Administrative Officer Class B, British Solomon Islands Protectorate.
- The Honourable Emily Susan Spens, Shorthand-Typist, Her Majesty's Embassy, Vienna.
- Isabel Edith Streater, Personal Assistant, United Kingdom Mission to the United Nations, New York.
- Sylvester Strong, Grade 9 Officer, HM Embassy, Washington.
- Bridget Amelia Swithinbank, Honorary British Vice-Consul, Jerez de la Frontera, Spain.
- Leonard John Taylor, First Secretary (Commercial), HM Embassy, Vienna.
- Valentine Charles Thornton, British Council Administrative Officer and Accountant, Pakistan.
- Tong Yu Sheung-woon. For services to education in Hong Kong.
- George Mark Tyler. For services to the British Community in Kuwait.
- Joseph Ernest Alfred Vaughan, Assistant Secretary (Development), Financial and Development Department, Gibraltar.
- Horace Adolphus Williams, Senior Field Officer, Agriculture Department, St. Lucia.

State of New South Wales

- Brian Colin Davidson. For services to the community.
- Alderman Arie John Dorsman. For services to local government.
- Wilfred Donald Ford. For services to industry.
- Ernest Royce Gregory. For services to the community.
- Edeline Jenkyn. For services to the community.
- Joan Griffith Jones. For services to the community.
- Sophie Evelyn Lender. For services to charity.
- Dorothy Noni McCallum, of Grafton. For services to the community.
- Desmond John O'Dell. For services to local government.
- William Albert Stanley Oldfield. For services to cricket.
- Marjorie Gertrude Eleanor Propsting. For services to local government.
- Sheila Winifred Gordon Scotter. For services to journalism and commerce.
- Daniel Joseph Seale. For services to local government.

State of Victoria

- Thomas Andrew Alston, of Oaklands Junction. For services to local government and the community.
- Councillor Arthur John Bett, JP, of Yea. For services to local government and the community.
- Beryl Mabel Bowler, of Lakes Entrance. For services to charity and the community.
- Councillor Robert Alexander Fraser, JP, of Glenthompson. For services to local government and the community.
- Councillor Edward Colin Hill, of Lilydale. For services to local government and the community.
- Councillor Walter Edwin Richard Hope, JP, of East Kew. For services to local government and the community.
- Councillor Horace Hilton Donald Ingersole, JP, of Warrandyte. For services to local government and the community.
- Councillor Reginald John Langdon, of Castlemaine. For services to local government and the community.
- Francis Hay Lonie, of Mount Martha For services to the education of deaf children and to the community.
- Norman John Neylan, of Ararat. For services to local government and the community.
- Vere Walter Page, JP, of Boronia. For services to local government and the community.
- Amy Dora Simpson, of Balwyn. For services to the Mission to Seamen and to the community.
- Councilor Dudley Clarence Stalker, of Colac. For services to local government and the community.
- Councillor Alfred James Wignell, JP, of Bacchus Marsh. For services to education and local government.

State of Queensland

- Edward Richard Webster Blackmore, of Brisbane. For services to ex-servicemen.
- Peter Bede English, MB, FRACS, of Brisbane. For services to medicine, especially ophthalmology.
- Alma Ellen Farr, of Kingaroy. For services to nursing.
- William George Allan Holmes, of Theodore. For services to the community.
- Sarah Keenan, of Brisbane. For services to nursing.
- Stewart Edward Keys, of Dalby. For community and charitable services.
- Jack Langdon, of Sarina. For services to harbour administration and to the community.
- Robert Charles Louis McMillen, of Brisbane. For public services.

State of South Australia

- Marjorie Maude Black, of North Adelaide. For services in the field of mental health.
- John Charles Masterman Hardy, of Fitzroy. For services to the blind.
- August Arthur Lodge, of Linden Park. For services to the horse racing industry.
- Alexander Gordon Maddern, of Berri. For services to the community.
- Annie Isabel Rankine, of Point McLeay. For services to the community.

State of Western Australia

- George Frederick Boucher. For charitable services to the community.
- William Henry Butler. For services to natural history.
- Dorothy Edna Genders, Deaconess, for services to the sick and destitute.
- Jessie Orton, JP. For services to the community.
- Gertrude Winifred Ruston, JP, of Perth. For services to the community.

State of Tasmania

- Luke Percy Cadden Heerey, JP, of Devonport. For services to ex-servicemen and to the community.
- Cora Button Tucker, of St. Helens. For services to charity and the community.
- Irene Lee Wolfhagen, of Sandy Bay. For services to the community.

=== Order of the Companions of Honour (CH) ===
- Sir Frederick William Mallandaine Ashton, CBE. For services to the Ballet.
- Dame Sybil Thorndike, DBE, (Agnes Sybil, Lady Casson). For services to the Theatre.

=== Companion of the Imperial Service Order (ISO) ===
Home Civil Service

- Leonard Henry Greenwood-Barton, Principal Scientific Officer, Ministry of Overseas Development.
- Herbert Grahame Blair, assistant director of Accounts, Ministry of Defence.
- Charles Abel Mackereth Cook, Deputy Master, Perth Branch, Western Australia, Royal Mint.
- Ernest Alexander Crossland, Senior Inspector of Taxes, Board of Inland Revenue.
- Harry Eric Nash Cullingford, Official Custodian for Charities, Charity Commission, Home Office.
- Stanley Christopher Edwards, chief executive officer, Ministry of Housing and Local Government.
- Albert Ernest Goddard, chief executive officer, Department of Health and Social Security.
- Robert Graham, chief executive officer, Department of Health and Social Security.
- Percy John Hardwick, Senior Principal Scientific Officer, Laboratory of the Government Chemist, Ministry of Technology.
- Laurence Barton Hislop, Principal Sea Transport Surveyor, Board of Trade.
- Frederick George Code Holland, formerly Principal Scientific Officer, Ministry of Technology.
- John Edward James, DSC, chief experimental officer, Ministry of Defence.
- Arthur Frederick Jenkinson, Principal Scientific Officer, Ministry of Defence.
- Leslie John Jolley, Senior Principal Scientific Officer, Ministry of Technology.
- Raymond Frederick Kyle, Principal Executive Officer, Ministry of Agriculture, Fisheries and Food.
- Arthur John Peacock, Foreign and Commonwealth Office.
- William Alfred Penn, chief executive officer, Ministry of Transport.
- Charles Alfred Pogson, Senior Inspector of Taxes, Board of Inland Revenue.
- Desmond Harold Reynolds, Senior Chief Executive Officer, Ministry of Defence.
- Thomas Joseph Salmon, chief executive officer, Department of Health and Social Security.
- Ronald Joseph Turner, Deputy Chief Investigation Officer, Board of Customs and Excise.
- Gerald Benjamin Walker, Assistant Accountant and Comptroller General, Board of Inland Revenue.
- Samuel Witzenfeld, chief executive officer, Office of Population Censuses and Surveys.

Diplomatic Service and Overseas List

- Richard Charles Clarke, Superintendent of Crown Lands and Survey, Hong Kong.
- Newton Clyde Roberts, MBE, lately Registrar-General, Bahama Islands.

State of New South Wales

- Edward Herbert Farmer, New South Wales Government Architect.

State of Victoria

- Thomas Francis Edington Mornane, lately Crown Solicitor.

State of Queensland

- Colin Hinton Thomson Curtis, CVO, Under-Secretary, Premier's Department.

=== British Empire Medal (BEM) ===
Military Division

Royal Navy

- Acting Regimental Sergeant Major Douglas Claude Ager, RM 8874.
- Marine Engineering Artificer (P) First Class Alan William Walker Brooks, D/MX 75171 (formerly on loan to the Royal Malaysian Navy).
- Chief Petty Officer (SPTI) William Gerald Buck, P/JX 760407.
- Chief Petty Officer (Dvr. I) Douglas Ivor Clarke, D/JX 418749.
- Chief Petty Officer Writer Lindsay Ernest Cooper, D/MX 868834.
- Chief Control Electrical Artificer Stanley George Cox, D/MX 888754.
- Chief Petty Officer (GL1) Robert Criggie, P/JX 151789.
- Chief Aircraft Artificer Robert Cunningham, L/FX 667809.
- Quartermaster Sergeant (CA) Leslie George Edward Day, DSM, Po/X 1540.
- Chief Ordnance Electrical Artificer (L) Charles Albert Evans, P/MX 62880.
- Chief Petty Officer Stores Accountant Ernest Frederick Frampton, P/MX 57038.
- Chief Petty Officer Caterer Derek Edward French, P/MX 871576.
- Quartermaster Sergeant (S) Charles Thomas Hugh Hazell, R.M. 7249.
- Chief Petty Officer (QA1) Robin Ernest Hewitt, P/JX 282294.
- Chief Wren Isobel Holmes, 47159, Women's Royal Naval Service.
- Chief Petty Officer Thomas William Hughes, Q991130, Royal Naval Reserve.
- Chief Mechanician George Frederick Lambert, P/KX 852150.
- Chief Radio Supervisor (RCI) Gordon Laws, P/JX 157010.
- Aircraft Artificer First Class Howard Marcus Lipscombe, L/FX 670105.
- Quartermaster Sergeant Gerard Francis Lynn, RMR 200680.
- Chief Air Fitter (AE) Stanley Arthur Macfarlane, L/FX 585143.
- Chief Marine Engineering Artificer (P) Bruce St. Clair Mackinnon, D/MX 68744.
- Chief Marine Engineering Artificer (P) George Pagett, P/MX 900962.
- Chief Engineering Mechanic Frederick James Parnell, D/KX 96793.
- Chief Petty Officer (TASI) David James Phelps, P/JX 820161.
- Chief Control Electrical Artificer (L) Kenneth Raven, D/MX 60466.
- Regimental Sergeant Major Maurice Henry James Ruff, Ch/X 5087.
- Master-at-Arms Alexander Somerville, D/MX 698343.
- Chief Ordnance Electrician Ronald Temple, P/MX 707543.
- Chief Engineering Mechanic John Thomas, P/KX 917165.

Army

- 23822622 Sergeant Colin Barry Auger, Royal Army Ordnance Corps.
- 22335947 Warrant Officer Class II (acting) Dennis Balme, Royal Army Ordnance Corps.
- 23090215 Staff Sergeant Peter William Barker, Royal Army Ordnance Corps.
- 22538340 Sergeant Charles Bogg, Corps of Royal Engineers.
- 23235757 Staff Sergeant John James Collins, Corps of Royal Military Police.
- 23545605 Sergeant Edwin John Robert Cook, The Royal Hampshire Regiment.
- 23624497 Staff Sergeant Patrick Frederick Crouch, The Royal Regiment of Wales.
- 23240901 Sergeant (acting) James Anthony Doherty, Corps of Royal Electrical and Mechanical Engineers.
- 2657224 Staff Sergeant Albert Henry Douglas Drake, Coldstream Guards.
- 14462153 Sergeant William Henry Fox, Royal Army Pay Corps.
- 23049774 Warrant Officer Class II (acting) John France, Scots Guards.
- 23264487 Sergeant David Thomas John Frederick, The Light Infantry.
- 21136114 Sergeant Ramparsad Gurung, Gurkha Signals.
- 22548064 Sergeant Frederick Rollings, Corps of Royal Electrical and Mechanical Engineers.
- 23521340 Staff Sergeant (acting) Victor Edward Frederick Hounsome, Army Catering Corps.
- 22205960 Corporal of Horse Cecil William Maurice Hunt, The Blues and Royals (Royal Horse Guards and 1st Dragoons).
- 23837964 Corporal Albert William Kitchen, Corps of Royal Engineers.
- 2734995 Staff Sergeant Evan Lewis, Welsh Guards.
- 23678206 Sergeant Bernard Frederick Lively, The Queen's Regiment.
- 2726555 Sergeant Norman Hurst Maddern, Irish Guards.
- 22218884 Sergeant (local) Frank Moffat, Royal Regiment of Artillery, Territorial and Army Volunteer Reserve.
- 22561381 Staff Sergeant Herbert Thomas Morris, The King's Regiment.
- 22973165 Warrant Officer Class II (acting) Joseph Oswald Pritchard, Royal Army Ordnance Corps.
- 4929189 Staff Sergeant Henry Arthur Puttick, The Royal Welch Fusiliers.
- 22802421 Corporal Harold Victor Ramus, The Parachute Regiment, Territorial and Army Volunteer Reserve.
- 23784654 Staff Sergeant Edward John Redfern, Royal Army Ordnance Corps.
- 23995636 Staff Sergeant Alan Stevenson, Corps of Royal Electrical and Mechanical Engineers.
- 22208332 Staff Sergeant Neville Thomas Stone, Royal Regiment of Artillery.
- 23982488 Corporal Raymond Strand, Corps of Royal Electrical and Mechanical Engineers.
- 22290516 Staff Sergeant Frederick McMillan Swanston, The Parachute Regiment, Territorial and Army Volunteer Reserve.
- 14477001 Staff Sergeant Arthur Varley, The Gordon Highlanders, now discharged.
- 22289916 Sergeant Leonard James Watts, Corps of Royal Electrical and Mechanical Engineers.
- 22274155 Staff Sergeant Stephen Harry Waudby, Royal Corps of Signals.
- 22231647 Sergeant Allan White, The King's Regiment.
- 22772288 Sergeant Kenneth Wilkinson, Royal Regiment of Artillery.

Royal Air Force

- Acting Warrant Officer Owen Glyndwr Erasmus, DFC, (M1314546).
- Acting Warrant Officer Thomas Melville (F1491407), RAF Regiment.
- Acting Warrant Officer Stanley Roberts (B0545318).
- M0569815 Flight Sergeant Gordon Avery Baker.
- K4070015 Flight Sergeant William Terence Condon, RAF Regiment (for services with the British Joint Services Training Team, Zambia).
- T1401426 Flight Sergeant Sidney William Cookson.
- M1880087 Flight Sergeant Wilson Davis.
- H4025647 Flight Sergeant John Kenneth Dawber.
- V0582552 Flight Sergeant James Frederick Williams Dowdell.
- A4017081 Flight Sergeant Leonard Ernest Gullidge.
- X3204227 Flight Sergeant Norman Cecil Henington.
- N4036966 Flight Sergeant George Ireland, RAF Regiment (for services with the Kenya Air Force).
- U0646420 Flight Sergeant Walter Mack.
- G4120015 Flight Sergeant Gerald Anthony Sproston.
- V0584904 Flight Sergeant Kenneth Cyril White.
- V4002940 Flight Sergeant James Yorke.
- X4024455 Acting Flight Sergeant Patrick Oswald Knights.
- E0530894 Chief Technician William Charles Cooke.
- K1923644 Chief Technician Charles William James Doe.
- H1922574 Chief Technician John Patrick Ernst.
- L0585939 Chief Technician Denis George Holton.
- W3501061 Chief Technician Derek Edmond Jellis.
- C4003673 Chief Technician Douglas Leys.
- S0586044 Chief Technician Lionel Barry Walter Smith.
- T1920732 Sergeant Eric William Collett.
- E4167253 Sergeant Alan Lawrence Cox.
- J1218265 Sergeant William Kenneth Godfrey.
- V3518140 Sergeant Michael John Greenaway.
- V4150499 Sergeant Geoffrey William Jerman.
- C3523285 Sergeant Derek Keeton.
- M4254563 Sergeant James Henryk Thomas Lowe.
- T0593124 Sergeant Harold Steven Owers.
- Y0589406 Sergeant John Arthur Ritchie.
- W4011244 Sergeant Robert Smith.
- L4011764 Sergeant William Smith, RAF Regiment.
- J4144720 Corporal Peter John Dunn.
- X4039399 Corporal Alexander Ralph Wilson.

Civil Division

United Kingdom

- Ludovic Nicholas Aien, Donkeyman, SS Bencleugh, Wm. Thomson & Company, (Ben Line Steamers).
- Madeline Lilian Amatrudo, Senior Messenger, Ministry of Transport.
- George Edward Amos, Training Officer and Shop Steward, Venesta Ltd.
- Williamina Anderson, State Enrolled Nurse, Sunnyside Royal Hospital, Montrose.
- Sydney George Armstrong, Garage Foreman, Messrs. Monk & Company, Civil Engineering Contractors, Warrington.
- Arthur Harold Arnold, Foreign and Commonwealth Office.
- Beryl Frances Ball, County Borough Staff, Barnsley, Women's Royal Voluntary Service.
- Edward Charles Barefoot, Office Keeper, Grade I, Ministry of Overseas Development.
- Arthur George Bartlett, Chargehand Mechanical Transport Driver "G", RAF Brize Norton.
- Edna Georgina Bartlett, Press Operator, Shaftmoor Lane Lamp Factory, Joseph Lucas (Electrical) Ltd.
- William Barton, Sample Passer, Lanarkshire Steel Works, British Steel Corporation.
- Harry Nathaniel Berry, Coast Preventive Man, Board of Customs and Excise.
- Richard Myles Black, Principal Officer, Friarton Young Offenders Institution, Perth.
- Henry Blue, Civilian Instructor, No. 354 (Dover) Squadron, Air Training Corps.
- George Bower, Smallholder, Little Woodcote Estate, Surrey. For services to agriculture.
- Walter George Bown, lately Craftsman I (Laboratory Mechanic), Admiralty Materials Laboratory, Holton Heath, Poole.
- Leila Campbell Bradley, Member, East Riding of Yorkshire Branch, British Red Cross Society.
- Annie, Mrs, Bray, Chargehand, Chamberlin & Hill Ltd, Iron Founders, Walsall.
- Henry Bruce, Technical Grade II, Ministry of Technology.
- David Arthur Bull, Tool setter, Wellworthy Ltd, Lymington.
- Frederick William Byway, Technical Officer Grade II, Metropolitan Police Office.
- Anne Callaway, National Savings Honorary Street Group Collector, Cardiff.
- Eleanor Mary Campbell, National Savings Honorary Group Collector, Salisbury.
- Alexander Cargill, Coastguard in Charge, Arbroath.
- William Alexander Carr, Diesel Maintenance Foreman, Transmitter Department, British Broadcasting Corporation.
- Kiu Chan, Storekeeper Class I, Naval Shore Base, Hong Kong.
- Edith A. Christian, lately House Mother, Quarrier's Homes, Bridge of Weir, Renfrewshire.
- Victor Claisse, Inspector, Metropolitan Police.
- Wilfred Clough, Chief Inspector, Birmingham City Police.
- Alexander Coffey, Technical Grade II, Ministry of Public Building and Works.
- Eric Colson, Plant Engineer, W. Vinten Ltd, Bury St. Edmunds.
- Caroline Cooke, lately Weaver, W. E. Yates Ltd, Leeds.
- Leslie Cookson, Locomotive Driver, Eastern Region, York, British Railways Board.
- Ivy Gertrude Cowan, Centre Organiser, Gosport Municipal Borough, Women's Royal Voluntary Service.
- John Craig, Electrician, Ministry of Finance, Northern Ireland.
- Nellie Margaret Crankshaw, Telephone Operator, HMS Dolphin, Gosport.
- George Herbert Crimble, Head Bedroom Steward, SS Pendennis Castle, British & Commonwealth Shipping Company Ltd.
- George Archibald Crudace, School Staff Instructor, Combined Cadet Force, Queen Mary's Grammar School, Walsall.
- Henry Cruttenden, Foreman, Elliott Flight Automation Ltd. For services to Export.
- William Walter George Culham, Gasfitter, Southend, North Thames Gas Board.
- Ellen Munro Currie, Forewoman, National Savings Bank Printing Press, Department for National Savings.
- William Arthur Redvers Dart, Linenkeeper, SS Oriana, P. & O. Steam Navigation Company.
- Albert Edward Davies, Colliery Overman, Markham Colliery, North Derbyshire Area, National Coal Board.
- Dorothy Jones Davies, Commandant, WL/112 Detachment, West Lancashire Branch, British Red Cross Society.
- Gordon Frederick Dewey, Electrician, Protective Gear and Telecommunication, South Western Electricity Board.
- Alfred John Dickinson, MM, Mate, Dredging Service, Ministry of Public Building and Works.
- Robert Dickson, Sub-Postmaster, Loanhead, Midlothian.
- John Donnachie, Overman (Special Duties), Bilston Glen Colliery, Scottish South Area, National Coal Board.
- Henry Earsman, Ranger, Forestry Commission.
- Edward Benjamin Edwards, Field Officer, Grade III, Ministry of Agriculture, Fisheries and Food.
- Ernest Elijah Ellis, Process and General Supervisory Grade IV, Fighting Vehicles Research and Development Establishment, Chertsey, Ministry of Defence.
- Esmor Ellis, Deputy Commissioner for Denbighshire, St. John Ambulance Brigade.
- Alfred George Englefield, Jointer, Extra High Tension No. 1 Area, Southern Electricity Board.
- John Beresford Evans, Constable, West Yorkshire Constabulary.
- Arthur Ernest Eyre, Sub-Officer, Glamorgan Fire Brigade.
- Charles Harry Faine, Furnace Manager, Redfearn National Glass.
- Andrew Farren, formerly SubDistrict Commandant, Ulster Special Constabulary.
- Isaac Fawkes, Racecourse Foreman, Carlisle.
- Ronald Alfred Ferdinands, Garrison Works Officer, Kluang Depot, Malaya, Ministry of Public Building and Works.
- Frederick William Flay, Senior Depotman, National Carriers Ltd, Bristol.
- Valentine Forster, Assistant Foreman, East Suffolk & Norfolk River Authority.
- Dennis Fothergill, Paperkeeper, Board of Customs and Excise.
- John Fothergill, Road Foreman, Westmorland County Council.
- Louis Charles John Friend, Inspector of Royal Parkkeepers, Regent's Park, London, Ministry of Public Building and Works.
- Gertrude Annie Gadd, Auxiliary Postwoman, Northampton.
- Lilian Amabel Marion Gandell, Centre Organiser, Horsham Urban District & Rural District, Women's Royal Voluntary Service.
- James Gardner, Senior Works Foreman, Hamilton Foundry, British Steel Corporation.
- George Gooding, Foreman, W. H. Mason & Sons, Burton-on-Trent.
- James Dryden Gray, Ambulance Driver, Northumberland County Council Ambulance Service.
- Albert George Green, Assistant Divisional Officer, Eastbourne Fire Brigade.
- Christopher Alexander Grigg, Postman, Western District Office, London.
- Edgar Charles Hacon, lately Ambulance Driver, Bramford Ambulance Station, Nr. Ipswich.
- George Hale, Sub-Assembly Fitter, Rolls-Royce Ltd, Aero Engine Division, Barnoldswick.
- Joseph Lewis Hall, Photo-Printer, Grade I, Lord Chancellor's Department.
- Frederick John Wilson-Hamilton, Commandant, Suffolk 10 Detachment, Suffolk Branch, British Red Cross Society.
- Alexander Kmghorn Henderson, Chief Observer, No. 1 (Kingsdown) Group, Royal Observer Corps.
- John Edmund Hewitt, Senior Engineer, Port Auxiliary Service, HM Dockyard, Gibraltar.
- Harry James Hill, Senior Scientific Assistant, Ministry of Agriculture, Fisheries and Food.
- Elizabeth Hogg, Member, Kent Branch, British Red Cross Society.
- Cyril George Holden, Civil Engineering Inspector, Essex County Council.
- John Thomas Holmes, Joinery Shop Manager, O. Weaver & Sons Ltd, Mexborough.
- Olive Emma Hopkins, lately Supervisor, Uckfield Telephone Exchange.
- William Christopher Hopper, Craftsman I Chargehand, Royal Radar Establishment, Ministry of Technology.
- Charles Arthur Howe, Superintendent and Divisional Commandant, York and North-East Yorkshire Special Constabulary.
- David Gwilyn Rhys James, Quartermaster, SS Matra, Cunard-Brocklebank Ltd.
- Slanley Johnson, Chargehand Electrician, Thames Television Ltd.
- Aneurin Bunford Jones, Technical Officer, Telephone Manager's Office, Cardiff.
- Gwennie Jones, Domestic Assistant, Maes y deri Children's Home, Glamorgan.
- William Dennis Jones, Chief Inspector, Road Services, The Automobile Association.
- William Morgan Jones, Commandant, 91 Detachment, Glamorgan Branch, British Red Cross Society.
- George Dougall Kirk, Chief Inspector, Metropolitan Police.
- William Frederick Knight, Security Guard, Grade 2, Political Adviser's Office, Singapore.
- Edward Cyril Larbalestier, Coxswain, St. Helier Lifeboat, Jersey, Royal National Lifeboat Institution.
- Annie Jane Larkin, National Savings Honorary Street and Social Groups Collector, Redhill, Surrey.
- Edward Frank Laws, Chief Foreman, Operating Department, Millbay Docks, Plymouth.
- Robert Lee, Coxswain, Douglas Lifeboat, Isle of Man, Royal National Lifeboat Institution.
- John Clifford Leonard, Assistant Operator, Temper Mill, Shotton Works, British Steel Corporation.
- Matthew Lethbridge, Head Launcher, Isles of Scilly Lifeboat, Royal National Lifeboat Institution.
- Jenny Lewis, Housemother, Llwyn View, Dolgellau, Merioneth.
- Joyce Constance Liddon, Centre Organiser, Taunton Borough, Women's Royal Voluntary Service.
- John Lusk, Senior Assistant Port Control Officer, Clyde Port Authority.
- Thomas Joseph Christopher McCabe, Office Keeper Grade II, Board of Inland Revenue.
- John Taylor Macdonald, Senior Foreman of Works, Wandsworth Prison.
- Donald Kenneth Maclean, Boatswain, MV Hesperus.
- George McUtchen, Cadet Officer, City of Aberdeen Branch, British Red Cross Society.
- Harold Magill, Chief Ship Inspector, Ministry of Agriculture for Northern Ireland.
- John Mitchell Maitland, Craftsman I, Workshop, National Engineering Laboratory, Ministry of Technology.
- Thomas Henry Mann, Rules & General Inspector, Croydon, British Railways Board.
- Leslie Marples, Foreman (Contracting Section), Matlock District, East Midlands Electricity Board.
- Elizabeth Marshall, Domestic Worker, Edinburgh College of Domestic Science.
- Robert John Martin, formerly Inspector, Royal Ulster Constabulary.
- James Wallace Mason, Warehouseman, HM Stationery Office, Harrow.
- Charles John Mathews, Civilian Instructor, Bermondsey Sea Cadet Corps Unit.
- Henry J. Merrett, School Crossing Patrol Attendant, Kidlington.
- Leslie Hughes Merrifield, Museum Technician, Tate Gallery.
- Alphonsus Miller, Pumpman, SS Hemifusus, Shell Tankers (U.K.) Ltd.
- George Edward Mills, lately Chargehand Labourer, 8 Signal Regiment, Catterick.
- Annie Sarah Milton. For services to the community in Hexham.
- Francis Leonard Mitchell, Sub-Postmaster, Liskeard, Cornwall.
- Lilian Doris Moore, National Savings Honorary Street Group Collector, Cheltenham, Gloucestershire.
- Mabel Morgan, Member, Cheshire 50 Detachment, British Red Cross Society.
- Florence Winnie Morley, National Savings Honorary Street Group Collector, Greenwich.
- Ernest Morris, Foreman Linesman, Caernarvon District, Merseyside and North Wales Electricity Board.
- Robert Edward Morris, Superintendent, Machine Tool Assembly Shop, Kearney & Trecker-CVA Ltd, Hove.
- Edward James Mount, District Commandant, Kent County Special Constabulary.
- Norman John Mowbray, Electrician, Metropolitan Police Office.
- Arthur George Muddiman, Gasfitter, Kingston District, South Eastern Gas Board.
- Herbert Richard Niles, Storeman, Coxside Works, Plymouth, South Western Gas Board.
- Albert Partington, Telephone Operator, Kearsley Power Station, North Western Region, Central Electricity Generating Board.
- Herbert William Perrett, Mess Steward Class II, H.Q. Wales Officers Mess, Brecon.
- Kenneth Alfred Perryman, Sergeant, Metropolitan Police.
- John Arthur Petersen, Foreman of Drill Grinding Section, Guided Weapons Division, British Aircraft Corporation Ltd, Stevenage.
- James Petticrew, Divisional Officer, Belfast, St. John Ambulance Brigade.
- Albert Edward Phillips, Relief Station Manager, Southern Region, British Railways Board.
- James Pike, Public Services Vehicle Body Fitter, Thames Valley Traction Co. Ltd.
- Ernest Henry Finn, Technical Grade III, National Physical Laboratory.
- Stephen Powers, Inspector, Metropolitan Police.
- Thomas Albert Prince, Warrant Officer, No. 1063 (Herne Bay) Squadron, Air Training Corps.
- Goronwy Pughe, Shepherd, Merioneth.
- Brenda Victoria Purkis, Telephone Switchboard Operator, Portsmouth Employment Exchange.
- James Ernest Read, Inspector of Work for Navy Department, Eleco Ltd, St. Albans.
- Walter Charles Read, Head Attendant, National Galleries of Scotland.
- William Reeves, Airfield Refuelling Operator, Heathrow, Shell-Mex & B.P. Ltd.
- James McKenzie Reid, lately Chief Officer, HM Prison Gartree, Leicester.
- Ernest Richards, Sub-Officer, Caernarvonshire Fire Brigade.
- Joseph Riley, Liftman, Associated Television Ltd.
- Edward Harold Merrett Roberts, Porter/Driver (Industrial), Ministry of Agriculture, Fisheries and Food.
- Robert Stephen Robinson, Welding Foreman, Erskine Bridge.
- Sydney Lambert Rushford, Millwright, Felling Government Training Centre. Department of Employment and Productivity.
- John Joseph Ryan, "A" Rate Fitter, British Aircraft Corporation Ltd, Filton.
- Laura Sandham. For services to Youth in Workington.
- Leslie George Scott, Electrician Grade I, Wolverton Works, British Railways Board.
- Lionel Derek Scott, Coxswain, Mumbles Lifeboat, Royal National Lifeboat Institution.
- William Scott, Locomotive Fireman, Ashington Colliery, Northumberland, National Coal Board.
- Alice Ada Senior, National Savings Honorary Village Group Collector, Shatton, North West Derbyshire.
- Edward Parmons Shreeve, Station Officer, HM Coastguard, Walton-on-Naze.
- Clarence Hugh Kenneth Slater, Road Foreman, Kesteven County Council.
- Maxwell Herbert Sleightholme, Technical II, Shop Foreman, Unit Workshops, Ministry of Defence.
- Herbert Charles George Sloacombe, Gas Fitter, Ryde, Isle of Wight, Southern Gas Board.
- John Miller Smith, Inspector of Works, Sir Owen Williams & Partners.
- Sidney William Snell, Station Officer, London Fire Brigade.
- Robert McEwan Soutter, Ambulance Driver, Scottish Ambulance Service.
- John Spellman, Progress Chaser, Garringtons Ltd, Darlaston.
- Jack Stafford, lately Porter, Chadacre Agricultural Institute, Suffolk.
- John Stephen, Auxiliary Coastguard-in-Charge, Cairnbulg, Aberdeenshire.
- John Ashton Stevens, Voluntary Auxiliary Nurse, Barry Accident and Surgical Hospital.
- Agnes Stewart, Honorary Collector, Street Savings Group, Belfast.
- Harry Reginald Stivey, lately Police Constable, Weapons Group, Aldermaston, United Kingdom Atomic Energy Authority.
- Cyril Herbert Swanbrow, Scientific Assistant, Chemical Inspectorate, Woolwich.
- Frank Taylor, Bus Driver, East Midland Motor Services Ltd.
- John Taylor, Safety Officer, Astley Green Colliery, North Western Area, National Coal Board.
- Charles William Todd, Process and General Supervisory Class Grade III, HM Dockyard Portsmouth.
- Alfred Tomlinson, Deputy Commandant, Lancashire Special Constabulary.
- Arthur Toon, Ambulance Driver, Derby County Borough.
- Edward Turner, Works Technical Officer II, Ministry of Public Building and Works.
- Sarah Alice Waddingham, Process and General Supervisory Grade IV, Royal Ordnance Factory, Blackburn.
- George William Wade, Motor Transport Driver, HMS Daedalus, Lee-on-Solent.
- Bertie George Wakefield, Domestic worker, West Norfolk and King's Lynn General Hospital.
- William Walker. For services at the Star and Garter Home for Disabled Sailors, Soldiers and Airmen.
- Dorothy Watson, National Savings Honorary Street Group Collector, Morpeth, Northumberland.
- Victor Wilkinson, Station Supervisor, Movements Department, Bradford Eastern Region, British Railways Board.
- Helen Ursula Williams, Member, Camden London Borough, Women's Royal Voluntary Service.
- Hubert Willis, Station Officer, Huntingdon and Peterborough Fire Brigade.
- William John Winship, Inspector, City of Glasgow Police.
- Thomas Withers, Apron Services Supervisor, Prestwick Airport, British Airports Authority.
- Reginald William Wood, Constable, Lincolnshire Constabulary.
- George William Workman, Security Guard Grade 2, British High Commission, Lusaka.
- Anne Worrall, Instructor & Examiner, Oakham Detachment Rutland Branch, British Red Cross Society.
- Dorothy Annie Worrall, Storewoman A, Spares Sub Depot, Command Ordnance Depot, Donnington.

Overseas Territories

- John Charles Barley, Collector of Rates and Taxes, Condominium Government Treasury and Customs Department, New Hebrides.
- John Ernest Ferrary, Sorting and Counter Clerk, Post Office, Gibraltar.
- Rodgers Eardley James. For services to the Boy Scout Movement in Dominica.
- Gordon McMahon, Workshop Foreman, Marine Department, British Solomon Islands Protectorate.
- Rigney Vincent Nelson, lately Sergeant-at-Arms, St. Lucia.

State of New South Wales

- Myrtle Doreen Bates. For services to ex-Servicemen and women.
- Harry Little Brown, lately Keeper of Exhibits, Museum of Applied Arts and Sciences.
- Charles Vincent Eastburn. For services to the community, particularly to the blind.
- Michael Hervey. For services to journalism.
- John Joseph McEncroe. For services to the community.
- Gordon Arthur McKenzie. For services to education in Hurstville.
- Nadine Olissoff. For services to the community, particularly to animal welfare.
- Jane Elizabeth Rymes. For services to ex-Servicemen and women.
- Harold Sayer. For services to the mentally handicapped.
- Cecil Douglas Taylor. For services to education.

State of Victoria

- Gladys Bell. For services to child welfare in East Geelong.
- Coral Hope Borgas, Central Radio Control Operator, Upper Yarra Fire Brigades Group.
- Charles Walter Donne. For services to the community, particularly to Fire Brigades in Mornington.
- Roy Dore, JP. For services to Fire Brigades in Carrum.
- Bertie Victor Eames. For services to the Corps of Commissionaires in Clifton Hill.
- Charles James Hemming, lately Senior Messenger to the Judges of the County Court.
- John Lawson. For services to horticulture in Yallourn.
- Jessie Irene Ludge. For services to the community in Korumburra.
- Nan Maie Lukey, Field Officer, National Fitness Council.
- Laurence John Maguire, JP. For services to the community, particularly to Fire Brigades in Boronia.
- Alfred Edward Moxey. For services to the Corps of Commissionaires in Kew.
- William Henry Fleming. For services to fire-fighting in Springhurst.
- Clifford Bertram Ward Radford. For services to the community in Fairfield.
- Charles Roberts. For services to Orbost Urban Fire Brigade.
- Alan Schramm, MM. For services to Fire Brigades in Lorne.
- Dudley John Schubert, JP. For services to Fire Brigades in Baranduda.
- James Leo Simpson, lately Foreman Shop Carpenter, Public Works Department.
- Kathleen Margaret Tyrrell, lately Secretary to the Judges of the Workers Compensation Board.
- William Annandale Whyte, Clerk, Protocol Section, Premier's Department.

State of Western Australia

- Charles Henry Brown. For services to the community.
- Adelaide Victoria Amy Farrow, of Wagin. For services to music and to the community.
- Marie Innes Goyder. For services to the community.
- David Alexander Hossack McGillivray. For services to the community particularly to youth.
- Maud Ellen Ray, of Busselton. For services to the community.
- Leonard Henry Wilkinson. For services to ex-Service Men and Women.

=== Royal Red Cross (RRC) ===
- Group Officer Margaret Caygill, Princess Mary's Royal Air Force Nursing Service.

==== Associate of the Royal Red Cross (ARRC) ====
- Joyce Harvey, Superintending Sister, Queen Alexandra's Royal Naval Nursing Service.
- Catherine Forsyth, Head Naval Nurse, Queen Alexandra's Royal Naval Nursing Service.
- Major Joan Caroline Cross (355263), Queen Alexandra's Royal Army Nursing Corps.
- Captain Christine Mary Greenhalgh (477318), Queen Alexandra's Royal Army Nursing Corps.
- Squadron Officer Pamela Fickus Colam (407298), Princess Mary's Royal Air Force Nursing Service (Retd.).
- Squadron Officer Mavis Joyce Young (407584), Princess Mary's Royal Air Force Nursing Service.

=== Air Force Cross (AFC) ===
Royal Air Force

- Wing Commander Laurence Alfred Jones (607364), Royal Air Force.
- Wing Commander Donald McClen (4065528), Royal Air Force.
- Wing Commander John Wilkinson (607250), Royal Air Force.
- Squadron Leader Charles Boyack (3511402), Royal Air Force.
- Squadron Leader Anthony Jacques Hopkins (4164806), Royal Air Force.
- Squadron Leader Trevor Singleton Chaplin Jones (3511195), Royal Air Force.
- Squadron Leader Richard Henry Brayn Le Brocq (607683), Royal Air Force.
- Squadron Leader Donald John MacDougall (1595832, Royal Air Force).
- Acting Squadron Leader Graham George Bayliss, DFC, (506808), Royal Air Force.
- Flight Lieutenant Gordon Brownless (583272), Royal Air Force.
- Flight Lieutenant Peter Rhys Evans (607555), Royal Air Force.
- Flight Lieutenant William James McCormack (1601527), Royal Air Force.
- Flight Lieutenant Stuart Graham Pearce (505601), (Retd.), Royal Air Force.
- Flight Lieutenant Peter Reginald Rayner (2555564), Royal Air Force.
- Flight Lieutenant John Bankier Robinson (4098311), Royal Air Force.
- Flight Lieutenant William Richard Shrubsole (1804440), Royal Air Force.
- Flight Lieutenant John Henry Stannard (203764), Royal Air Force.

=== Queen's Police Medal (QPM) ===
England and Wales

- Peter Jack Matthews, Chief Constable, Surrey Constabulary.
- Arthur Burns, DSO, Chief Constable, Suffolk Constabulary.
- David Earsman Dalzell, Deputy Chief Constable, Liverpool and Bootle Constabulary.
- Arthur McCartney, DFC, Assistant Chief Constable, Devon and Cornwall Constabulary.
- Brian Morrissey, Assistant Chief Constable, Hampshire Constabulary.
- Norman John Horatio Darke, Commander, Metropolitan Police.
- Cyril Jack Dace, Commander, Metropolitan Police.
- George Herbert Burgoyne, Commander, Metropolitan Police.
- George Thomas Cairns, MBE, lately Chief Superintendent, Lancashire Constabulary.
- Frank Douglas Slack, Chief Superintendent, Norfolk Joint Police.
- Kenneth Jenkins, Chief Superintendent, Gwent Constabulary.
- Thomas Henry McCullough, Chief Superintendent, Nottinghamshire Combined Constabulary.
- Thomas Malcolm Edwards, Chief Superintendent, Metropolitan Police.
- Kenneth Edward Smith, Superintendent, Lancashire Constabulary — seconded as Commandant, Police Training Centre, Bruche.

Scotland

- William Kerr, OBE, Chief Constable, Dunbartonshire Constabulary.
- Donald Allan MacInnes, DFC, Chief Constable, Perth and Kinross Constabulary.

Northern Ireland

- Robert Sidney Swan, Inspector, Royal Ulster Constabulary.

Isle of Man

- Robert James Kermeen, lately Superintendent and Deputy Chief Constable, Isle of Man Constabulary.

State of New South Wales

- Everard Douglas John Baldwin, Superintendent, 1st Class, New South Wales Police Force.
- Desmond James Rose, Superintendent, 1st Class, New South Wales Police Force.
- Eric Robert Parmeter, Superintendent, 2nd Class, New South Wales Police Force.
- Alwyn Vivian Wood, Superintendent, 2nd Class, New South Wales Police Force.
- Roy George Jordan, Superintendent, 2nd Class, New South Wales Police Force.
- Frederick William Collings, Superintendent, 2nd Class, New South Wales Police Force.
- Mervyn Joseph Whelan, Superintendent, 2nd Class, New South Wales Police Force.
- Edwin Brady, Superintendent, 3rd Class, New South Wales Police Force.
- Arthur John Carney, Superintendent, 3rd Class, New South Wales Police Force.
- Charles Edwards Dennett, Superintendent, 3rd Class, New South Wales Police Force.

State of Victoria

- John George McLaren, Assistant Commissioner, Victoria Police Force.
- Lindsey George Bent, Superintendent, Grade I, Victoria Police Force.
- James Andrew Ottery, Chief Inspector, Victoria Police Force.
- Arthur John Slater, Chief Inspector, Victoria Police Force.
- Lindsey Neil Patterson, Inspector, Grade I, Victoria Police Force.
- Colin Pearce Griffiths, Inspector, Grade I, Victoria Police Force.

State of Western Australia

- James Henry Graham, Superintendent, Western Australian Police Force.
- Ethel Violet Scott, Senior Inspector, Western Australian Police Force.

Malawi

- Frank Barrington Chevallier, Senior Assistant Commissioner, Malawi Police Force.

Overseas Territories

- Stanley Clement Scholar, Deputy Superintendent (Acting Chief of Police), Royal St. Lucia Police Force.

=== Queen's Fire Services Medal (QFSM) ===
England and Wales

- George Ernest Sykes, Divisional Officer, Grade III (Deputy Chief Officer), Grimsby Fire Brigade.
- Ewart Reginald James Northcott, Divisional Officer, Grade I (Deputy Chief Officer), Cornwall Fire Brigade.
- Peter Howard Darby, Chief Officer, Lancashire Fire Brigade.
- Sidney Charles Hazell, Chief Officer, Bath Fire Brigade.

Scotland

- Eric William Macintyre, Firemaster, Northern Area Fire Brigade.

Overseas Territories

- Martin Eldon Grimes, lately Fire Commissioner, Hamilton Fire Brigade, Bermuda.

=== Colonial Police Medal (CPM) ===
Brunei

- Benjamin Michael Gerrard Carvalho, Deputy Superintendent, Royal Brunei Police Force.
- Mohammad Ali bin Ali Akbar, Inspector, Royal Brunei Police Force.

Overseas Territories

- Dunstan Cecil Babb, Sergeant, Royal Bahamas Police Force.
- Elliott Balban, Superintendent, Gibraltar Police Force.
- Willis Alexander Bullard, Inspector (Acting Assistant Superintendent), Royal Bahamas Police Force.
- Chan Leung, Staff Sergeant Class I, Royal Hong Kong Police Force.
- Michael Wilton Cheney, Superintendent, Royal Hong Kong Police Force.
- Cheng Choong-chiu, Fireman Class I (Marine), Hong Kong Fire Services.
- Choi Nam, Sergeant, Royal Hong Kong Police Force.
- Chong Chung, Principal Fireman, Hong Kong Fire Services.
- Felix Constantine, Detective Inspector, Royal St. Vincent Police Force.
- Claude Hubert Crichlow, Inspector, Royal St. Lucia Police Force.
- Erold Farquharson, Sergeant, Royal Bahamas Police Force.
- Stanley James Flower, Superintendent, Royal Hong Kong Police Force.
- Elvin Granville Fowler, Sergeant, Fire Branch, Royal Bahamas Police Force.
- Ivan Gilbert Hanley, Corporal, Royal St. Christopher-Nevis-Anguilla Police Force.
- Kemuel Hepburn, Sergeant, Royal Bahamas Police Force.
- Lincoln Oswald Hercules, Inspector, Royal Bahamas Police Force.
- Ho Chak-lam, Principal Fireman (Marine), Hong Kong Fire Services.
- John Patrick Holloway, Assistant Superintendent, British Solomon Islands Protectorate Police Force.
- Robert Holmes, Assistant Chief Fire Officer, Hong Kong Fire Services.
- Thomas Solomon Jarvis, Assistant Superintendent, Royal Antigua Police Force.
- Kong Yiu-wing, Senior Inspector, Royal Hong Kong Police Force.
- Lau Kai-fat, Senior Inspector, Royal Hong Kong Police Force.
- Leung Kwok-biu, Sergeant, Royal Hong Kong Police Force.
- Nathaniel Thomas Lightbourne, Corporal, Royal Bahamas Police Force.
- Duncan George McNeil, Superintendent, Royal Hong Kong Police Force.
- Alastair John McNiven, Superintendent, Royal Hong Kong Police Force.
- Victor Arthur Martin, Sergeant, Royal St. Christopher-Nevis-Anguilla Police Force.
- Eric Arthur Mortemore, Superintendent, Royal Bahamas Police Force.
- Victor Osmund Moss, Superintendent, Royal Hong Kong Police Force.
- Bernard Albert Arthur Newman, Superintendent, Royal Hong Kong Police Force.
- Ng Wai, Staff Sergeant Class I, Royal Hong Kong Police Force.
- Ngan Hung, Staff Sergeant Class II, Royal Hong Kong Police Force.
- Nemani Raikuna, Deputy Superintendent, Fiji Police Force.
- Dudley Eugene Swan, Detective Sergeant, Bermuda Police Force.
- Leonard Erickson Taylor, Corporal, Royal Bahamas Police Force.
- Wan Chi-kwong, Constable, Royal Hong Kong Police Force.
- Yeung Ting-wah, Sergeant, Royal Hong Kong Police Force.

=== Queen's Commendation for Valuable Service in the Air ===
Royal Air Force

- Wing Commander Michael Rupert Thomas Chandler (4036416).
- Squadron Leader Joseph Louis Benjamin Boutin (506993).
- Squadron Leader Peter Desmond (1921674).
- Squadron Leader Richard Albert Miller (5037273).
- Squadron Leader Ian Thomson (2620647).
- Flight Lieutenant Frederick Archbold (178726).
- Flight Lieutenant Stanley William Archer, DFM, (158003).
- Flight Lieutenant Geoffrey Roger Barrell (4230442).
- Flight Lieutenant Michael Anthony Clegg (685147).
- Flight Lieutenant Raymond Reginald Curtis (4136949).
- Flight Lieutenant Robin Scott Hargreaves (4230416).
- Flight Lieutenant Bryan Pears Holme (2711286).
- Flight Lieutenant Robert William Kimmings (1269552).
- Flight Lieutenant John Terry Kingsley (4165147).
- Flight Lieutenant Neil Roderick Macleod (4230668).
- Flight Lieutenant Alan James Mayo (168028).
- Flight Lieutenant Michael Richard Merrett (3510758).
- Flight Lieutenant Geoffrey James Pearce (582738).
- Flight Lieutenant Peter Patrick Pilkington (3503578).
- Flight Lieutenant Christopher Ian Cunningham Rounce (4231378).
- Flight Lieutenant Roy Smith (3110171).
- Flight Lieutenant Richard John Snell, AFM, (574514).
- Flight Lieutenant Nicholas Gordon Warner (608398).
- Flight Lieutenant Frederick William Youngs (3510508).
- Master Air Electronics Operator Patrick Duncan (L4040123).

United Kingdom

- Philip John Bryant, Aircraft Commander, Caledonian Airways.
- John Cochrane, Deputy Chief Test Pilot (Concorde), British Aircraft Corporation Ltd, Wisley Airfield, Ripley, Surrey.
- John Frederick Farley, AFC, Test Pilot, Hawker Siddeley Aviation Ltd, Dunsfold Aerodrome, Godalming, Surrey.
- William Patrick Ingram Fillingham, Deputy Chief Test Pilot, Hawker Siddeley Aviation Ltd, Hatfield, Herts.
- John Lester Gregory, Senior Captain, British Overseas Airways Corporation.
- Katrina Elizabeth Gutfreund, Chief Stewardess, British European Airways.

== Australia ==
=== Knight Bachelor ===
- Daniel Sidney Aarons, OBE, MC, Treasurer, Liberal Party of Australia, New South Wales Division. For distinguished services to politics.
- The Honourable Kenneth McColl Anderson, Minister for Supply. For long and distinguished public and political services.
- William Alexander Dargie, CBE, chairman, Commonwealth Art Advisory Board. For distinguished services to art.
- Peter Richard Heydon, CBE, Secretary, Department of Immigration, Canberra. For distinguished public service.
- Hamilton Morton Howard Sleigh, of Toorak, Victoria. For distinguished services to the petroleum industry and community welfare.

=== Order of the Bath ===
==== Companion of the Order of the Bath (CB) ====
Military Division

- Major General Francis George Hassett, CBE, DSO, MVO, (227), Australian Staff Corps.

=== Order of Saint Michael and Saint George ===
==== Companion of the Order of St Michael and St George (CMG) ====
- Francis John Davis, OBE, chairman, Commonwealth Serum Laboratories, Victoria.
- Morris Gael Davis, MD, FRACP, of East Malvern, Victoria. For services to medicine.
- James Arthur Martin, of Medindie, South Australia. For services to commerce.
- Jack Stanley Smith, of Toorak, Victoria. For services to commerce and industry.

=== Order of the British Empire ===
==== Dame Commander of the Order of the British Empire (DBE) ====
Civil Division

- Margaret (Peggy) van Praagh, OBE, of Flemington, Victoria. For long and distinguished services to Australian Ballet.

==== Knight Commander of the Order of the British Empire (KBE) ====
Civil Division

- The Most Reverend Philip Nigel Warrington Strong, CMG, Primate of Australia and Archbishop of Brisbane. For long and distinguished services as a churchman.

==== Commander of the Order of the British Empire (CBE) ====
Military Division

- Major-General Stuart Mitchell McDonald, MC, ED, (387426), General List, Commander Third Division.
- Brigadier Frederick Thomas Whitelaw (281), Australian Staff Corps, Military Secretary Army Headquarters.
- Air Commodore Glen Albert Cooper, DFC, AFC, (033028), Royal Australian Air Force.

Civil Division

- Captain Samuel James Benson, RD, of Point Clare, New South Wales. For services to politics and shipping.
- Gladys Ruth Gibson, OBE, of Adelaide, South Australia. For services in advancing the interests of Australian Women.
- Ewen Campbell Laird, of Newtown, Victoria. For services to the community.
- Frederic Ernest Lampe, MBE, Director, Australian Elizabethan Theatre Trust.
- Ernest Victor Llewellyn, MBE, Director, Canberra School of Music.
- William Stephen Matthews, President, Federal Council, Royal Flying Doctor Service of Australia.
- William Langham Proud, of Horsham, Victoria. For services to the community.
- Brigadier Alfred Gordon Rowell, President, Australian College of Dental Surgeons.
- Leon Rossiter Dalglish Stahle, OBE, of Mornington Rural, Victoria. For services to politics.

==== Officer of the Order of the British Empire (OBE) ====
Military Division

Royal Australian Navy

- Captain Kenneth William Shands.
- Commander Robert John Whitten.

Australian Military Forces

- Colonel Francis Desmond Buckland (2374), Royal Australian Survey Corps.
- Colonel Adrian Geoffrey Finley, ED, MB, BS, (2146556), Royal Australian Army Medical Corps.
- Colonel Richard Kennedy Fullford (237529), Australian Staff Corps.

Royal Australian Air Force

- Wing Commander Denis Alfred Boyd Carter (033645).
- Group Captain John Reginald Henchy, MBE, (0217028).

Civil Division

- Peter Charles Alexander, JP, of Chatswood, New South Wales. For services to ex-Servicemen and women.
- John Brackenreg, MBE, of Killara, New South Wales. For continued services in the promotion of Australian Art.
- Robert Bruce Brown, of Kirribilli, New South Wales. For public service.
- John Edward Cummins, of Kew, Victoria. For services to science.
- Harry Alfred Forbes, Collector of Customs, New South Wales.
- Samuel John Arthur Fripp, of Parkville, Victoria. For services to the community.
- Harry Sydney Goldstein, of Bellevue Hill, New South Wales. For services to the community, especially to ex-Servicemen.
- Lieutenant-Colonel Arthur Henry Dalzell Hind, of Murrumbeena, Victoria. For services to the community.
- John Raymond Hopkins, of Wahroonga, New South Wales. For services to music.
- Russell Tullie Madigan, of East Camberwell, Victoria. For services to the mining industry.
- Bruce Philip Lambert, Director, Division of National Mapping, Department of National Development, Canberra.
- Morris James Lea, of Caulfield, Victoria. For public service.
- Paliau Maloat, of Lipan Village, Territory of Papua and New Guinea. For services to local government.
- Donald Jasper Munro, First Assistant Secretary, Economic Division, Prime Minister's Department, Canberra.
- Ernest Stanley Owens, of Point Piper, New South Wales. For services to commerce.
- Marjorie Alice Collett Parker, MBE, of Launceston, Tasmania. For services to the community.
- Julius Lockington Patching, of South Yarra, Victoria. For services to sport.
- Karl Barry Petersson, Commissioner of Patents, Canberra.
- Councillor Robert Starritt Rankin, JP, of Milloo, Victoria. For services to local government.
- Norma Redpath, of Milan, Italy. For services to sculpture.
- Frank Leonard Roberts, of North Caulfield, Victoria. For services to civil aviation.
- Phillip Roberts, BEM, Liaison Officer, Council for Aboriginal Affairs, Northern Territory.
- Herbert Percy Seale, District Commissioner, Morobe District, Territory of Papua and New Guinea.
- Margaret Sutherland, of Hawthorn, Victoria. For services to music.
- Robert John Walsh, FRACP, BS, of Epping, New South Wales. For services to science.
- Norman Richard Wyndham, MD, MS, of St. Ives, New South Wales. For services to medicine.
- John William Youl, of Toorak, Victoria. For services to the timber industry.

==== Member of the Order of the British Empire (MBE) ====
Military Division

Royal Australian Navy

- Lieutenant Commander Aart Hopman, Royal Australian Naval Volunteer Reserve.
- Acting Commander Herbert William Stapleford, Royal Australian Naval Emergency Reserve.

Australian Military Forces

- Major Sydney George Barber (485), Royal Australian Armoured Corps.
- Major William James Chitts (340021), Australian Staff Corps.
- Major George Leslie Horsfall (337701), Australian Staff Corps.
- Captain Arthur Henry Parsons, ED, (3905042), Royal Australian Artillery Corps.
- Major Jessie May Perkins, ED, (F31702), Women's Royal Australian Army Corps.
- Warrant Officer Class I Louis Alfred Reid (51773), Royal Australian Infantry Corps.
- Warrant Officer Class II James Seery (2167671), Royal Australian Infantry Corps.
- Warrant Officer Class II Frederick William Smith (21391), Royal Australian Infantry Corps.
- Major Rennie Heath Standley (1109), Royal Australian Infantry Corps.
- Major John Frederick Thomson (17538), Royal Australian Engineers.
- Warrant Officer Class I Anthony Charles Toghill (210105), Royal Australian Infantry Corps.

Royal Australian Air Force

- Warrant Officer Allen William Gibbs (A51647).
- Warrant Officer Michael Vernon Hyland (A21463).
- Squadron Leader John Albert Newman (011408).
- Flight Lieutenant Anthony Edward Thornton (0216059).

Civil Division

- John Handyside Barnes, MB, BS, of Cairns, Queensland. For services to medical research.
- George Arthur Bennett, of Campbell, Canberra. For public service.
- Thomas Boyd Law, MB, ChM, of Ballina, New South Wales. For services to the community.
- Iris May Cram, Steno-Secretary to Secretary, Department of the Cabinet Office, Canberra.
- Veronica Crowe, of Broken Hill, New South Wales. For services to the community.
- Eric Albert Curwood, Engineer Class 4, Ordnance Factory, Maribynong, Victoria.
- Edwin Francis Edwards, of Vaucluse, New South Wales. For services to the community, particularly to child welfare.
- Constance Fairhall, Welfare Officer, Department of Social Development and Home Affairs, Territory of Papua and New Guinea.
- Helen Whitten Fraser, of Narrabundah, Australian Capital Territory. For services to Girl Guide's and the community.
- Richard Edward Garrard, of Torquay, Victoria. For services to sport.
- Stanley Herbert Garward, Chief Architect, Airport Engineering Branch, Ground Facilities Division, Department of Civil Aviation, Victoria.
- Danga Goi, Malaria Control Assistant, Department of Public Health, Minj, Territory of Papua and New Guinea.
- Lorrae Gorshenin (Miss Lorrae Desmond) of Cammeray, New South Wales. For services to entertainment and the welfare of the Australian Forces in Vietnam.
- John Harwood, of East Preston, Victoria. For services to ex-Servicemen and women.
- David Ernest Henshaw, Principal Research Scientist, Division of Textile Industry, Commonwealth Scientific and Industrial Research Organisation, Victoria.
- George Edward Hitchins, Commonwealth Director of Migration, Sydney, New South Wales.
- Henry Thomas Hogan, Regional Director, Bureau of Meteorology, South Australia.
- Timothy Hughes, MM, chairman, South Australian Aboriginal Lands Trust.
- Michael Joseph Kennedy, Inspector, Pay Office, Department of the Army, Canberra.
- David Gordon Kirkpatrick, (Slim Dusty), of Metung, Victoria. For services to entertainment.
- Henry Joseph Krips, Resident Conductor, South Australian Symphony Orchestra.
- Rodney Laver, of Los Angeles, California, United States of America. For services to sport.
- Meysie Reeve Law, of Launceston, Tasmania. For services to the community.
- Kathleen Eileen Lester, Welfare Officer, Foundation for Aboriginal Affairs, New South Wales.
- Barnaby Roxley Lyne, Deputy Commissioner for Repatriation, Queensland.
- Edith Muriel McHugh, of Pearl Beach, New South Wales. Formerly Sister, Obstetrics Department, Canberra Community Hospital.
- Flora McNab, of Chatswood, New South Wales. For services to politics.
- Archibald Cochrane Miller, Works Manager, Williamstown Naval Dockyard, Victoria.
- Stirling George James Parker, Assistant Director-General (Medical & Scientific), Department of Works, Victoria.
- Colin Pearson, Corrosion Expert, Defence Standards Laboratories, Melbourne, Victoria.
- Mahuru Rarua Rarua, of Port Moresby, Territory of Papua and New Guinea. For services to the community.
- Ernest Abraham Reynolds, of Melbourne, Victoria. For services to the community, particularly to the Deaf and Dumb.
- Harold Swinbourn Robertson, Executive Engineer, Postmaster-General's Department, Victoria.
- Harold Rogers, Superintendent, Personnel Branch, Postmaster-General's Department, Victoria.
- Gladys Maude Ross, of Epping, New South Wales. For services to the community.
- William Rutherford, of Newmarket, Queensland. For services to ex-Servicemen and women.
- Salaen Sakaen, of Finschhafen, Territory of Papua and New Guinea. For public service.
- Peter Scriven, of Paddington, New South Wales. For services to the theatre.
- Peter Sculthorpe, of Woollahra, New South Wales. For services to music.
- Loretta-Marie Slattery (Sister Mary Clair), of Griffith, Australian Capital Territory. For services to education.
- Lesle Symes, of Waterloo, New South Wales. For services to Librarianship.
- Vincent Nicholas Vlasoff, of Cairns, Queensland. For his work in the recovery of cannon jettisoned by Captain Cook from HMB Endeavour off the Queensland coast.
- Walter Nelson Wakeling, of West Ryde, New South Wales. For services to politics.
- Kathleen Jean Mary Walker, of Holland Park, Queensland. For services to the community.
- Denis Joseph Hubert Walsh, Officer-in-Charge, Ship Inspection Section, Quarantine Division, Department of Health, Victoria.

=== Companion of the Imperial Service Order (ISO) ===
- Clifford Amandus Burmester, Assistant National Librarian, National Library of Australia, Canberra.
- Ernest Wright Easton, Senior Assistant Director-General, Finance and Accounting, Postmaster-General's Department, Victoria.
- John William Nunn, First Assistant Secretary (Finance & Logistics), Department of the Army, Canberra.

=== British Empire Medal (BEM) ===
Military Division

Royal Australian Navy

- Chief Petty Officer John Thomas Bradford (R38482).
- Chief Petty Officer Darcy Clyde Johnson (R28588).
- Chief Petty Officer Owen Michael Kiernan (R100597), Royal Australian Naval Reserve.
- Chief Petty Officer John Joseph Orford (R36666).

Australian Military Forces

- Sergeant Frederick William Andrews (2238440), Royal Australian Infantry Corps.
- Staff Sergeant Neil Edward Ellem (213845), Royal Australian Infantry Corps.
- Sergeant Dorothy Nellie Gaggin (F25082), Women's Royal Australian Army Corps.
- Sergeant (Temporary Warrant Officer Class 2) Reginald Hughes (13661), Australian Army Catering Corps.
- Staff Sergeant (Temporary Warrant Officer Class 2) Lionel Stanley Jackson (26046), Royal Australian Infantry Corps.
- Staff Sergeant Francis John McGuinness (25518), Royal Australian Army Service Corps.
- Sergeant Robin Winter Pullinger (2411151), Royal Australian Corps of Signals.
- Private (Temporary Sergeant) William Bruce Warnes (41797), Royal Australian Army Service Corps.
- Staff Sergeant Victor Xuereb (2270034), Royal Australian Engineers.

Royal Australian Air Force

- Flight Sergeant Joseph Graham Carton (A11971).
- Corporal Peter Raymond Jackson (A315272).
- Flight Sergeant Dorothy Justice (W21719S), Women's Royal Australian Air Force.
- Flight Sergeant Patnck James Turvey (A18802).

Civil Division

- Oscar Leonard Adnum, formerly Postmaster Grade 2, Aberdeen, New South Wales.
- Edwin Allen, Biochemist Grade 2, Commonwealth Health Laboratories, Kalgoorlie, Western Australia.
- Annie Mary Anderson, of Swan Vale, New South Wales. For services to the community.
- James Andrews, of Oakleigh South, Victoria. For services to the community.
- Ina Jane Bachert, Typist-in-Charge, Department of Shipping and Transport, Queensland.
- Marian Nance Bailey, JP, of Broadmeadow, New South Wales. For services to the community.
- Elva Bieler, of Hunters Hill, New South Wales. For public service.
- Jack Bohemia (Newbu), of Fitzroy Crossing, Western Australia. For services to the community.
- Violet Isobel Boykett, of Balmain, New South Wales. For services to the community.
- John Hamilton Buckham, former Air Traffic Controller Grade 2, Department of Civil Aviation, Parafield, South Australia.
- Aubrey John Terrance Cassidy, JP, of Enfield, New South Wales. For services to the community.
- Margaret Crowe, of Ootha, New South Wales. For services to the community.
- Christopher Dobunaba, Clerk, Forestry Department, and Secretary, Wamira Village Council, Konedobu, Territory of Papua and New Guinea.
- Tommy Dodd, of Amata, South Australia. For services to the community.
- Nancy Phyllis Downer, of Tarramurra, New South Wales. For services to the community.
- Frederick Adrian Dwyer, formerly Senior Postman, Sutherland, New South Wales.
- Winton Alfred Essex Evans, of Michelago, New South Wales. For services to the community.
- Daniel Gire, Sub-Inspector, Royal Papuan and New Guinea Constabulary, Boroko, Territory of Papua and New Guinea.
- Goma, Sergeant Second Class, Criminal Investigation Branch, Royal Papuan and New Guinea Constabulary, Goroka, Territory of Papua and New Guinea.
- Cicely May Hannan, of Pontville, Tasmania. For public service.
- John Bernard Horan, Senior Messenger and Receptionist, Public Service Board, Canberra.
- Juanita Ray Jackson, of Croydon, New South Wales. For services to ex-Servicemen.
- Robert William Richard James Kells, of Milton, New South Wales. For public service.
- Herbert Gordon Lavaring, Resident Officer-in-Charge. North Head Quarantine Station, Manly, New South Wales.
- Ernest Lawrence Lawson, of South Hurstville, New South Wales. For services to the community.
- Leonard Linton Ludlow, formerly Assistant Superintendent (Chief Telegraph Office), Postmaster General's Department, New South Wales.
- Muriel Joan McColl, Steno-Secretary to the Secretary, Department of Labour and National Service, Victoria.
- Walter Bachelor MacDougall, Native Patrol Officer, Weapons Research Establishment, Woomera, South Australia.
- Ernest John McKone, formerly Motor Driver, Department of Civil Aviation, Sydney, New South Wales.
- Waima Maribu, Senior Fireman (Acting Station Officer), Lae Fire Station, Morobe District, Territory of Papua and New Guinea.
- Charles Victor Milsom, of Uki, New South Wales. For public service.
- Campbell Samuel Moore, Gazette Officer, Prime Minister's Department, Canberra.
- Neville Murray, formerly Estimates Officer, Department of the Interior, Canberra.
- Margaret Noake, of Lane Cove, New South Wales. For services to the community.
- Dorothy Katherine Powell, of Strathfield, New South Wales. For services to ex-Servicemen.
- Winifred Irene Power, Telephone Office-keeper, Upper Widgee Telephone Exchange, Queensland.
- William Mearns Raeburn, JP, of Meadowbank, New South Wales. For services to the community.
- Ronald Richard Rochford, Senior Technical Officer, Commonwealth Scientific and Industrial Research Organisation, Canberra.
- Alice Maude Smith, of Cronulla, New South Wales. For services to the community.
- Phyllis Audrey Spurr, Steno-Secretary, House of Representatives, Canberra.
- Richard James Taber, formerly Accountant, House of Representatives, Canberra.
- Debessa Tapeo, Senior Warder First Class, Buimo Corrective Institution, Lae, Morobe District, Territory of Papua and New Guinea.
- Florence Maden Taylor, formerly Senior Training Officer, Repatriation Department, Victoria.
- Frank Charles Trew, of Cronulla, New South Wales. For services to the community, particularly ex-Servicemen.
- Aldur Urm, JP, of Thirlmere, New South Wales. For services to the community.
- Aleen Winifred Vidler, Overseer, Telephone Exchange, Tamworth, New South Wales.
- Flora Margaret Whelan, Steno-Secretary to the Secretary, Department of the Army, Canberra.
- Thomas James Edwin Wilton, of Miranda, New South Wales. Formerly Senior Mail Officer, Travelling Post Office.

=== Royal Red Cross (RRC) ===
- Group Officer Betty Bristow Docker, ARRC, Royal Australian Air Force Nursing Service.

==== Associate of the Royal Red Cross (ARRC) ====
- Squadron Officer Patricia Foote, Royal Australian Air Force Nursing Service.

=== Air Force Cross (AFC) ===
Royal Australian Air Force

- Squadron Leader Ian Barry Gration.
- Squadron Leader Robert Macarthur Greenwood.
- Squadron Leader Keith James Molloy.
- Squadron Leader Norman William Whyburn.
- Warrant Officer Keith William Muldowney.

=== Air Force Medal (AFM) ===
Royal Australian Air Force

- Flight Sergeant John Alexander Lewis.

=== Queen's Commendation for Valuable Service in the Air ===
Royal Australian Air Force

- Squadron Leader Donald Melvin.
- Squadron Leader Robin Kemp Page.
- Flight Lieutenant Allan Jeffery Pappin.
- Flight Lieutenant John Herbert Dunn.
- Sergeant Stewart Hampton Bonett.

== Sierra Leone ==
=== Order of Saint Michael and Saint George ===
==== Companion of the Order of St Michael and St George (CMG) ====
- The Honourable Mr. Justice Christopher Okoro Elnathan Cole, OBE, Acting Chief Justice.

=== Order of the British Empire ===
==== Officer of the Order of the British Empire (OBE) ====
Civil Division

- Derek Egerton Clilverd, Director, Diamond Corporation (West Africa) Limited.
- The Honourable Paramount Chief Alimamy Dura II, MP, Paramount Chief of Safroko Limba Chiefdom, Northern Province.
- Joscelyn Bishop Gooding, JP. For services to commerce.
- Arthur Salaco Christopher Johnson, Auditor-General.

==== Member of the Order of the British Empire (MBE) ====
Civil Division

- Samuel Fortunatus Bradford Campbell, Principal, Sir Milton Margai School for the Blind, Freetown. For valuable services to education.
- Metcalfe Ajadi Cole, JP, Founder-Member of the Sierra Leone Parliamentary Association. For services to politics and civic affairs.
- Wilfred Zachariah Cole, Marampa Mines, Northern Province. For services to the Trade Union movement.
- May Dworzak, Catering Manageress, House of Representatives. For valuable official services.
- Alfred Cornelius Patrick Labor, Senior Auditor. For valuable official and public services.
- Leticia Macfoy, Port Loko District, Northern Province. For services to commerce and public affairs.
- Josephus Cornelius Ajai Tucker, Chief Superintendent of Police.

=== Queen's Police Medal (QPM) ===
- James Kalie Koroma, Acting Deputy Commissioner, Sierra Leone Police Force.

== Mauritius ==
=== Order of the British Empire ===
==== Commander of the Order of the British Empire (CBE) ====
Civil Division

- Jean Philippe Lagesse. For services to industrial development.

==== Officer of the Order of the British Empire (OBE) ====
Civil Division

- Julius Alexandre Alfred Bhujoharry. For services to education.
- Ajum Tjma Sheik Cassim. For political and public services.
- Mohunlal Mohith. For voluntary social welfare work.

==== Member of the Order of the British Empire (MBE) ====
Civil Division

- Ramparsade Dewdanee. For services to rural local government.
- France Raymond Domingo. For services to the trade union movement and the development of Whitleyism in the Mauritius public service.
- Sadapersad Teemul. For voluntary service in the field of social development.
