= Aboriginal South Australians =

Indigenous Aboriginal peoples of South Australia

The Aboriginal South Australians are the Indigenous people who lived in South Australia prior to the British colonisation of South Australia, and their descendants and their ancestors. There are difficulties in identifying the names, territorial boundaries, and language groups of the Aboriginal peoples of South Australia, including poor record-keeping and deliberate obfuscation, so only a rough approximation can be given here.

Many Aboriginal South Australians refer to themselves as Nunga, and those in the APY lands use the term Anangu.

== Its people ==
The following groups' lands include at least partly South Australian territory which includes: Adnyamathanha, Akenta, Amarak, Bungandidj, Diyari, Erawirung, Kaurna, Kokatha Mula, Maralinga Tjarutja, Maraura, Mirning, Mulbarapa, Narungga, Ngaanyatjarra, Ngadjuri, Ngarrindjeri, Nukunu, Parnkalla, Peramangk, Pitjantjatjara, Ramindjeri, Spinifex people, Warki.

== Colonial intent ==
The South Australia Act 1834 described the land as "waste" and "uninhabited", but unlike other colonies in Australia, the British settlement of South Australia did not assume the principle of terra nullius (Latin for nobody's land) when the colonists originally arrived. The Letters Patent establishing the Province of South Australia issued in February 1836 "Provided always that nothing in those our Letters Patent contained shall affect or be construed to affect the rights of any Aboriginal Natives of the said Province to the actual occupation or enjoyment in their own Persons or in the persons of their descendants of any lands there in now actually occupied or enjoyed by such Natives".

The Proclamation of South Australia read out on Proclamation Day, 28 December 1836, at the founding of the permanent settlement that became Adelaide, granted Aboriginal people and British settlers equal protection and rights as British subjects under the law.

== Protector of Aborigines ==
Interim appointments (1836–1839):

- George Stevenson
- Walter Bromley
- William Wyatt

Gazetted appointments:

- Matthew Moorhouse, 20 June 1839 – 31 March 1856
- John Walter, 21 November 1861 – 26 September 1868
- Edward Lee Hamilton, 1873–1908
- William Garnett South, 1908–1923

Sub-protectors:

- Edward John Eyre, Sub-Protector on the Murray River 1841–1847
- Edward Bate Scott, Sub-Protector on the Murray River, 1848–1857 and later as Protector of Aborigines
- Francis James Gillen was Alice Springs special magistrate and Aboriginal sub-protector for central Australia, when still part of SA, from 1892

As first the first gazetted appointment in 1839, Moorhouse's role was described as protecting the interests of Aboriginal people, identifying the tribes, learning their language, and teaching them "the arts of civilization" - including reading, writing, and cultivation. He was also to give them a knowledge of Christian religion.

== Massacres ==
There have been a number of documented conflicts that resulted in mass deaths of Aboriginal people throughout the continent, now sometimes referred to as "frontier wars". In South Australia, the government tried to strengthen laws in an attempt to avoid the violence that befell earlier Australian settlements, and Aboriginal people were declared British subjects and afforded the same privileges. However, the laws were rarely enforced, and as the frontiers of settlement spread, dispossessed Aboriginal people responded with aggression.

In July 1840, there was a massacre of Europeans by Aboriginal men in South Australia, when about 26 shipwrecked passengers and crew members of the ship Maria were murdered. The ship had run aground somewhere in the southern Coorong and all aboard made it safely to shore. They were initially assisted by the Ngarrindjeri people, until a misunderstanding or disagreement led to the murders. A punitive expedition was mounted by Governor Gawler, who gave permission to execute up to three suspects without formal trial. Major O'Halloran carried out the order.

In 1841, at least 30 Aboriginal people were killed in an incident known as the Rufus River Massacre, after a series of skirmishes in the Central Murray along the old Aboriginal route recently made into the overland stock route. A party of which included police and the SA Protector of Aborigines, Matthew Moorhouse, and overlanders bringing cattle to market in Adelaide from New South Wales, became involved in a clash with the local Maraura people. Although the location was and still is in New South Wales, not South Australia, the official party was sent out from Adelaide on the orders of the Governor of South Australia, the newly appointed George Grey. The traditional lands of the Maraura people stretched deep into South Australian territory.

In 1848, at least nine people of the Wattatonga clan (of either the Bungandidj people or Tanganekald people) were allegedly murdered by the station owner James Brown in the Avenue Range Station massacre (near Guichen Bay on the state's Limestone Coast). Brown was subsequently charged with the crime, but the case was dropped by the Crown for lack of (European) witnesses. Christina Smith's source from the Wattatonga tribe refers to 11 people killed in this incident by two white men.

In 1849 at least ten Nauo people were killed in retribution for the killing of two settlers and the theft of food, in the Waterloo Bay massacre at Elliston on the west coast of Eyre Peninsula.

== Settlements ==
As Europeans spread across South Australia, a number of Christian missionaries set up mission stations to reach out to Aboriginal people. Many of these became Aboriginal towns and settlements in later years.

Ernabella was established as a Presbyterian mission station for Aboriginal people in 1937, driven by medical doctor and Aboriginal rights campaigner Charles Duguid (then president of the Aborigines Protection League), and supported by the South Australian government.

== Stolen generations ==
In 1909, the Protector of Aborigines in South Australia, William Garnet South, reportedly "lobbied for the power to remove Aboriginal children without a court hearing because the courts sometimes refused to accept that the children were neglected or destitute". South argued that "all children of mixed descent should be treated as neglected". His lobbying reportedly played a part in the enactment of the Aborigines Act 1911. This designated his position as the legal guardian of every Aboriginal child in South Australia, not only the so-called "half-castes".

Following the National Inquiry into the Separation of Aboriginal and Torres Strait Islander Children from Their Families and the publication of the Bringing them Home report (1995–1997), the parliament of the Northern Territory and the state parliaments of Victoria, South Australia, and New South Wales passed formal apologies to the people affected. On 26 May 1998, the first "National Sorry Day" was held; reconciliation events were held nationally, and attended by a total of more than one million people. Mounting public pressure eventually caused Prime Minister John Howard to draft a motion of regret, passed in federal parliament in August 1999, which said that the Stolen Generation represented "the most blemished chapter in the history of this country."

== Native title ==
Despite the inequalities that transpired during the early years of European settlement, some areas of the state are now subject to native title of varying kinds and degrees. This ranges from freehold ownership to the right to access Crown Land in their former range. The Anangu Pitjantjatjara Yankunytjatjara Land Rights Act 1981 grants rights over about 10% of South Australia in the northwest of the state, including a former Aboriginal reserve and three cattle stations.

== Prominent individuals ==
- David Unaipon - Unaipon is a Ngarrindjeri man who appears on $50 note for his inventions and contributions to society.
- Sir Douglas Nicholls - South Australia is the only state of Australia to have appointed an Aboriginal Governor of South Australia, Nicholls, who was appointed in December 1977. Nicholls was from the Yorta Yorta people of what is now northern Victoria.

== Modern Aboriginal life ==
21st century Aboriginal people live in South Australia in a number of settings ranging from complete integration to English-speaking culture to near-traditional life in traditional homelands speaking predominantly the pre-European languages. Some live in or loosely associate with Aboriginal communities based on former mission stations such as Pukatja (formerly Ernabella). Anangu Pitjantjatjara Yankunytjatjara (APY) Lands are now freehold Aboriginal land in the northwest of the state, with limited access to tourists and visitors, created by Anangu Pitjantjatjara Yankunytjatjara Land Rights Act 1981.

The Kaurna language of the Adelaide Plains had become virtually extinct, but is now being revived and taught to children in Kaurna Aboriginal schools.

== See also ==
- British colonisation of South Australia
- History of South Australia
- Living Kaurna Cultural Centre

=== 19th century Aboriginal missions in SA ===
- Killalpaninna
- Koonibba
- Point Pearce
- Point McLeay (Raukkan)
- Poonindie
