= Percy Wells (businessman) =

English businessman (1825–1909)

Percy Wells (15 February 1825 – 2 December 1909) was an English businessman who had a career in the colony of South Australia. Wells acted as agent in South Australia for the English marine engineering firm of Wells Brothers, of which his brother George Wells was a principal.

== Business career ==
Wells arrived in Port Adelaide in May 1858, and for nearly two years worked as accountant for the Adelaide Advertiser. He was then engaged by the firm of Philip Levi & Co., in which his uncle Alfred Watts was a partner.

Subsequently, he entered into partnership with Watts as agents for English investors who had a plan unveiled in 1869 to construct an outer harbour in Largs Bay free of cost to the South Australian Government. This project, if approved, would allow the berthing of ships of deeper draught than possible in Port Adelaide, despite extensive (and expensive) dredging. The scheme was well received by the Adelaide newspapers, but unsurprisingly opposed by vested interests at Port Adelaide, and was rejected by a select committee of the Legislative Council. It would have meant giving the consortium monopoly rights to the facilities provided, a not dissimilar situation to the modern provision of toll roads. A later, Government funded, scheme was promoted by Rowland Rees, MHA.

Wells acted as agent in South Australia for the English marine engineering firm of Wells Brothers, of which his brother George Wells was a principal. George was a licensee of Mitchell's screw pile patent, a system for rigidly mounting structures to solid rock. Wells submitted a tender to the South Australian Government for installation of a lighthouse on the Margaret Brock Reef using this technology, and despite protestations of men like O. A. Babbage, the tender was as accepted. The tender price had however been based on a false assumption of the number of days calm enough to operate the machinery and the one year job ended up taking three, and resulted in the bankruptcy of the contractor W. F. King. But the work was eventually completed and the Cape Jaffa lighthouse went into operation in 1872.

He later controlled the erection of the Tiparra Reef lighthouses, a jetty on the Cape Jaffa reef, and jetties at Kingston SE and Rivoli Bay. Disputes arose between the firm of Wells Brothers and the Government, and after legal proceedings and reference to arbitration the latter agreed to take over the plant and material and finish the work.

== Other activity ==
Prior to first visiting Australia, Wells was an active Freemason, and laid was one of those whose efforts culminated in the Grand Lodge of South Australia, the Mother Grand Lodge of Australasia. He was in consequence given a grand reception by the Lodges and Chapters when he returned to Adelaide for a brief residence in 1902 and 1903.

He was one of the founders of the Pharmaceutical Society of Great Britain, and around 1880 took the degree of M.D. in an American University, but he rarely practised. He made important discoveries in pharmacy, but only took out one patent.

Wells returned to England with his family on the Orient Line ship Yatala in 1872, which on 27 March was wrecked off France, but without loss of life. He died in Merseyside.

== Family ==
He was married to Caroline (7 July 1831 – 7 July 1901)(1 July 1899?). He was survived by one daughter and seven sons, including:

- Edmund Percy Wells CE (c. 1855 – 30 August 1920) was a successful civil engineer, died in Jersey.
- Frederick Bagshawe Wells (c. 1857 – 29 January 1925), married Bessie Harbron of Heidelberg, Victoria (then known as Warrigal) on 25 July 1890, lived in Adelaide.
- (Francis) Harry Wells married Esther Ethel Mead on 26 November 1904. He married again, to Margaret Louisa Rogers of Kensington on 21 July 1912. He served as a mounted constable in South Australia and the Northern Territory, later became South Australia's first Registrar of Motor Vehicles.
- Alfred Wells (16 May 1859 – 8 December 1935) was an Adelaide architect associated with Edmund Wright, then Latham A. Withall.
