= Yarilde =

Yarilde or Jarildekald may be,

- Jarildekald people
- Jarildekald language
