= Aboriginal Witnesses Act =

1844 South Australian ordinance

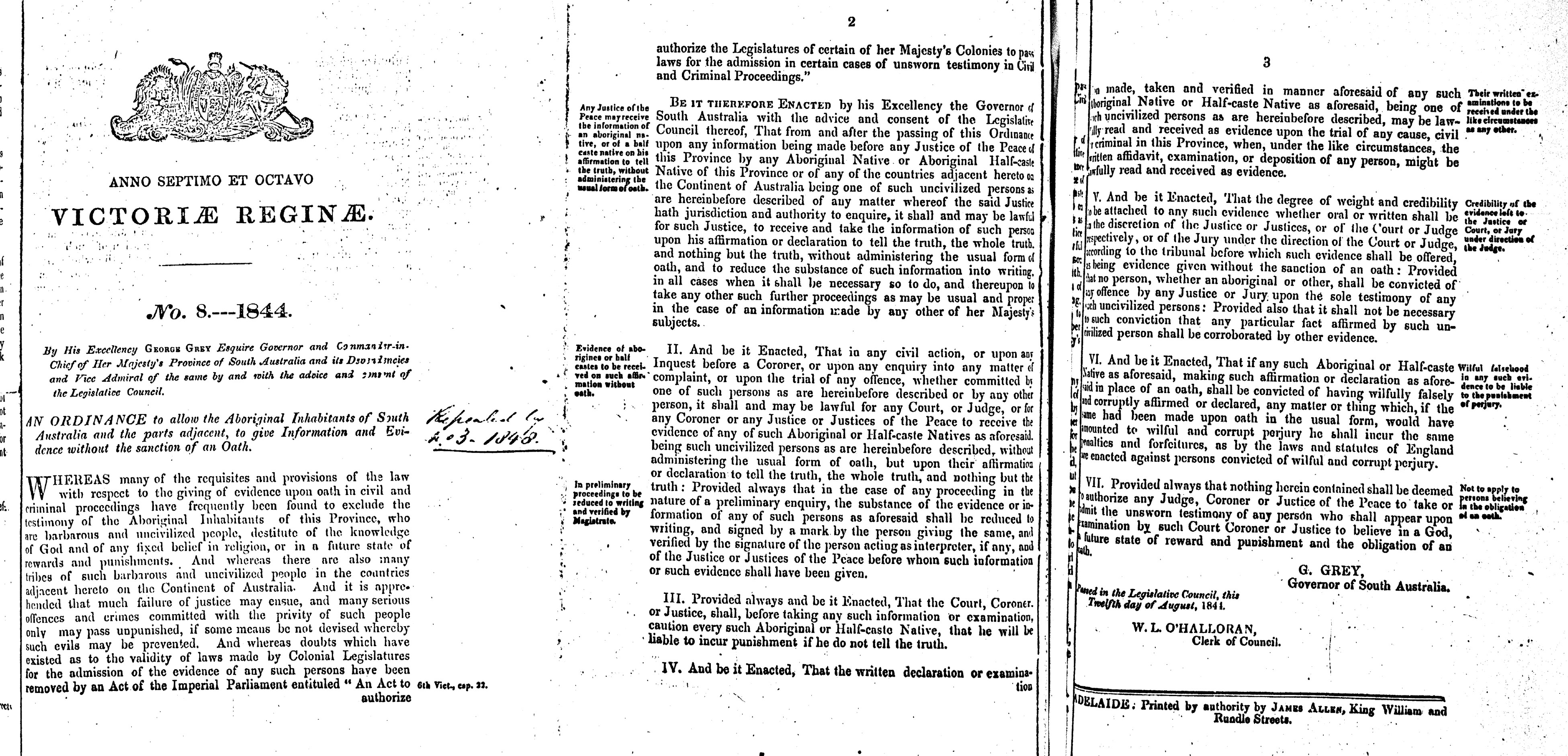
Original Aboriginal Witnesses Act 1844-no8

The Aboriginal Witnesses Act 1848 was a series of South Australian ordinances, acts and amendments that permitted Indigenous South Australians to give unsworn evidence in Court, because at the time it was considered that Indigenous people could not make an oath. The Act existed from 1848 until 1929.

Enacted by Governor of South Australia George Grey during the early colonial period of South Australia, the act was established "To facilitate the admission of the unsworn testimony of Aboriginal inhabitants of South Australia and parts adjacent". Despite the act's stated aims being to facilitate Aboriginal testimony, it had the opposite effect, creating a situation where the massacre of Aboriginal peoples by European colonisers could not be tried solely on the evidence of Aboriginal witnesses.

== History ==
In 1844, the Aborigines' Evidence Act 1844 was enacted. This was followed by the 1848 Aboriginal Witnesses Act 1848.

Governor George Grey was responsible for the act, and later Governor Frederick Robe was responsible for the act's amendments. While its stated aim was to make provisions for unsworn testimony by "uncivilised people" to be admissible in court, the act made it possible for a judge to dismiss the testimony of an "uncivilised person or persons" as insufficient unless corroborated by other evidence - that the court could not base the conviction of a white man on the testimony of an aboriginal witness alone. Although it was a progressive law for the time, the act decreed that the credibility of the evidence be left to the discretion of "the justice of the court, or jury under direction of the judge". The act also made Aboriginal testimony inadmissible in trials that carried the penalty of death.

Effectively, the act created a situation where settler solidarity and the law of evidence ensured that the murder and massacre of aboriginal Australians by European colonisers could not be tried solely on the evidence of aboriginal witnesses. Possibly in response to the Avenue Range Station massacre, where three Tanganekald women, two teenage girls, three infants, and an "old man blind and infirm" were murdered by Australian mass murderer and pastoralist James Brown, the Aboriginal Witnesses Act of 1848 was amended in July 1849 to allow a person to be convicted on the sole testimony of an aboriginal person, though this rarely occurred.

The act remained in force until 1929.

== See also ==
- Aboriginal Cultural Heritage Act 2003
- Aboriginal Heritage Act 1988
- Aboriginal Heritage Act 2006
- Aboriginal Lands Act 1995
- Aboriginal Land Rights Act 1976
- Aboriginal Protection Act 1869
- Australian heritage law
- Half-Caste Act
- Native Title Act 1993
