= Tanganekald =

Tanganekald may refer to:

- Tanganekald people
- Tanganekald language
