= Portaulun =

Portaulun may refer to:

- Portaulun people
- Portaulun language
