= Avenue Range Station massacre =

Massacre in South Australia

- Part of Australian frontier wars
- Avenue Range Station (Australia)
- Location: 36°42′40″S 140°09′48″E; Avenue Range
- Date: ~September 1848
- Attack type: Massacre
- Weapon: Firearms
- Deaths: Nine to eleven
- Victim: Aboriginal people
- Motive: Aboriginal resistance to being forced off their traditional lands

The Avenue Range Station massacre was a murder of a group of Aboriginal Australians by white settlers during the Australian frontier wars. It occurred in about September 1848 at Avenue Range, a sheep station in the southeast of the Colony of South Australia.

Information is scarce about the basic facts of the massacre, including the exact date and number of victims. A contemporary account of the massacre listed nine victims – three women, two teenage girls, three infants, and an "old man blind and infirm". Another account published by Christina Smith in 1880 gave the number of victims as eleven, and specified that they belonged to the Tanganekald people. Pastoralist James Brown and his overseer, a man named Eastwood, were suspected of committing the murders in retaliation for attacks on Brown's sheep.

In January 1849, reports of the massacre reached Matthew Moorhouse, the Protector of Aborigines. He visited the district to investigate the claims, and based on his enquiries Brown was charged with the murders in March 1849. Proceedings against Brown began in June 1849 and continued in the Supreme Court of South Australia for several months, but were eventually abandoned. Some key witnesses, including Eastwood, either fled the colony or refused to cooperate with the investigation. There were also significant restrictions on the use of evidence given by Aboriginal witnesses, especially where a verdict could involve capital punishment. These legal hurdles and settler solidarity ensured the case did not go to trial, although the magistrate who committed him for trial told a friend that there was "little question of the butchery or the butcher".

Although the details of the case were known for decades after the murders, distortions of the massacre eventually appeared in print and were embellished by local white and Aboriginal historians. Two key aspects of these later accounts were that Brown poisoned rather than shot the victims, and that he had undertaken an epic horse ride to Adelaide to establish an alibi. Historians Robert Foster, Rick Hosking and Amanda Nettelbeck contend that these "pioneer legend" alterations downplayed the seriousness of the crime.

== Background ==
Location of Avenue Range Station within South Australia

The colony of South Australia was established by white settlers in December 1836. In early 1839, settlers began spreading out from the capital, Adelaide. That May, James Brown and his brother Archibald arrived in the colony from Scotland. The following year, they took up a property in the Encounter Bay district about 100 kilometres (62 mi) south of the capital. James then branched off on his own and established Avenue Range, a 178-square-kilometre (69 sq mi) pastoral run in the Guichen Bay district, about 270 kilometres (170 mi) southeast of Adelaide.

In common with other areas of Australia, settlers on the frontier in southeast South Australia employed various tactics to deal with Aboriginal resistance to being forced off their land. Initially, settlers attempted to keep them at a distance using threats of violence, but they soon escalated to using actual violence, hoping that by terrorising them they could prevent them from interfering with stock and other property. Violence by settlers towards Aboriginal people often went unreported to the authorities, and became more secretive after a settler was hanged in March 1847 for the murder of an Aboriginal man in the colony's southeast – the only such sentence carried out in the history of South Australia's early white settlement. This undeclared and covert fighting between settlers and Aboriginal people in South Australia is considered part of the Australian frontier wars.

== Massacre, investigation and legal proceedings ==
Reports were received by the colonial authorities in January 1849 that some Aboriginal people had been killed near Guichen Bay. On 19 February, the Protector of Aborigines, Matthew Moorhouse, arrived in the district to investigate. Moorhouse's role was to safeguard the rights and interests of Aboriginal people within the colony. He began his inquiries assisted by a mounted policeman, an interpreter, and an Aboriginal guide. An Aboriginal witness, Leandermin, took Moorhouse to the site of the alleged crime. He told Moorhouse that, on the day the killings occurred, he and a white man named Parker were walking along a road when they heard shots. He went to see what was happening and, from behind some trees, saw four or five Aboriginal women lying on the ground with fresh wounds. He also saw others on the ground, whom he presumed were dead because they were not moving. Two white men were present. Leandermin identified Brown as one of them, and stated that Brown had a gun in his hand. Brown's overseer, Eastwood, was suspected of being his accomplice.

Moorhouse and his party then examined the scene, locating five holes containing human remains. Scattered nearby they found human bones and cartridge paper discharged from a firearm. Eighty paces from the graves they located the remains of a fire which contained more bones. Moorhouse concluded that the bodies had first been buried, but later exhumed and burnt in an attempt to destroy the evidence. The date of the massacre is unclear. Moorhouse's original report in March 1849 stated that it had occurred some months before, and in his published report of October 1849, he placed it "about September" of 1848.

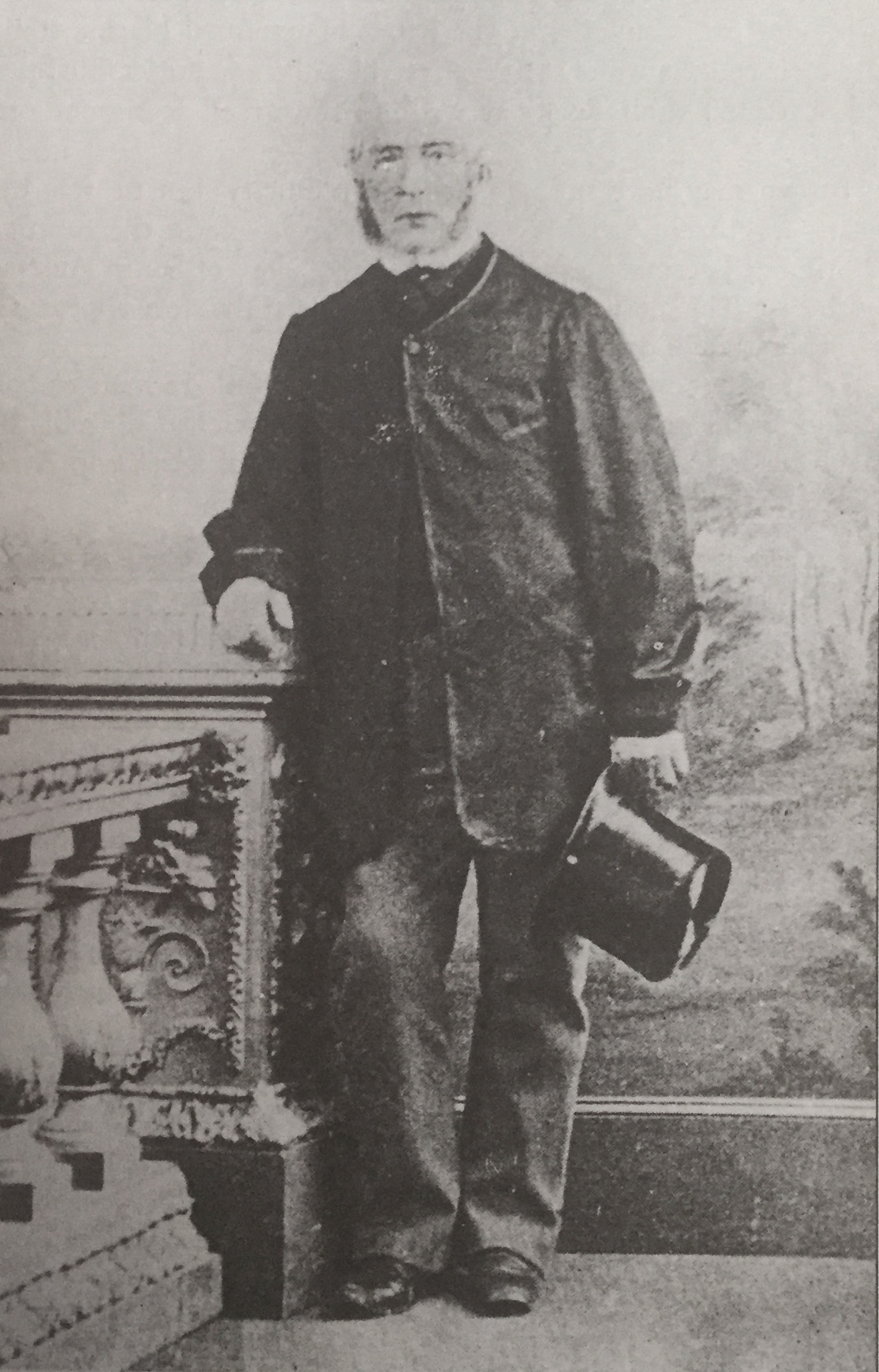
James Brown, a sheep farmer charged with murdering "unknown aboriginal natives"

On 1 March 1849, Brown was charged with the murder of "unknown aboriginal natives". In late March or early April he appeared before a local magistrate in the district, Captain G. V. Butler, who committed him for trial. In May, Butler wrote a letter to Charles Hervey Bagot, a member of the South Australian Legislative Council, in which he listed the victims as one "old man blind and infirm", three female adults, two teenage girls (aged 15 and 12 years), and three female children (aged two years, 18 months, and a baby). Butler added that there was "little question of the butchery or the butcher".

Brown's trial came before the Supreme Court in Adelaide on 11 June 1849. The presiding judge considered that the evidence presented was insufficient, and gave the prosecution another week to investigate. The weakness of the case was directly related to the provisions of the Aboriginal Witnesses Act of 1848 regarding testimony given by Aboriginal witnesses. It was generally believed that Aboriginal people could not understand the oath, but the Act allowed unsworn testimony to be offered by Aboriginal witnesses, with two significant limitations. The court could determine the weight and credibility to be given to Aboriginal testimony, but even more telling was the restriction that when the punishment for a crime was death or transportation, the evidence of an "uncivilised person or persons" was considered insufficient unless corroborated by other evidence. A week later, the judge remained unconvinced about the strength of the prosecution, but given "great suspicion rested on the case", he gave the prosecution a further extension of time, and released Brown on bail of £500.

In July 1849, the South Australian Advocate General produced a summary of the investigation to date. Several difficulties were detailed, including the fact that Parker denied any knowledge of the crime, as did others who were believed to have heard the incident, discussed in Brown's presence. Brown's co-accused, Eastwood, alias "Yorkie", had fled when the investigation began and had apparently left the colony aboard a whaling ship off Kangaroo Island. An important witness named Joice had gone to the neighbouring Port Phillip District of the colony of New South Wales, and Leandermin himself, who it appears was being detained at Guichen Bay, absconded and had allegedly been "made away with". The remaining witnesses were those that knew Brown, and apparently would not give evidence against him. Despite the extremely difficult task faced by the prosecution under these circumstances, the Advocate General ordered that investigations continue and issued warrants for the arrest of those that had fled South Australia. Brown appeared at the Supreme Court yet again on 10 and 28 September, but the judge again refused to hear the case without further evidence. By the November sittings of the court, Brown's case had been removed from the listings, and this was the end of the matter as far as the formal investigation was concerned. Effectively, settler solidarity and the law of evidence ensured that Brown was never tried for the murders, despite the fact that those involved in the investigation had no doubt of his guilt. Possibly in response to Brown's case, the Aboriginal Witnesses Act of 1848 was amended in July 1849 to allow a person to be convicted on the sole testimony of an Aboriginal person.

== Later account ==
In 1880, while Brown was still alive, the lay missionary Christina Smith wrote a book, The Booandik Tribe of South Australian Aborigines, which was published in Adelaide. It included memoirs from her time in the Rivoli Bay district, some 50 kilometres (31 mi) southeast of Guichen Bay. One of these was about an Aboriginal boy called Wergon, whom she had adopted in the 1840s. Wergon had converted to Christianity and went on several journeys to try to convert the local Aboriginal people. One of these evangelical visits was to the country of the Wattatonga tribe, (Note: According to the ethnologist and anthropologist Norman Tindale, Wattatonga was the name used by the neighbouring Bungandidj people to refer to the Tanganekald people.) a group whose traditional lands included the newly established Avenue Range Station. He returned from this trip to tell Smith that eleven of the tribe had been massacred by two white men. Wergon had persuaded a witness whose parents had apparently been killed in the massacre to return with him. According to Wergon, "the white men had shown no mercy to the grey-headed old man or to the helpless infant on its mother's breast", and the apparent motive for the massacre was the killing of sheep belonging to a settler in the Guichen Bay district. Smith's account did not include how the massacre was carried out, but did include the details that it was investigated, the bodies of the victims were burnt, and the murderer was discharged for lack of evidence. Smith did not name the settlers. In their 2001 book, the historians Robert Foster, Rick Hosking and Amanda Nettelbeck considered this unsurprising, given that Brown was alive and living nearby at the time Smith's book was published. While circumspect about naming Brown, Smith essentially recounted important details of the massacre in her book published over thirty years after it occurred.

== Legend of James Brown ==
Brown became wealthy through his pastoral interests, and by the 1860s had expanded his holdings to 470 square kilometres (180 sq mi). He died in February 1890, and three years later Simpson Newland published his novel, Paving the Way, a Romance of the Australian Bush. It contained a fictionalisation of actual events on the frontier. One of the stories in the book is that of Roland Grantley, a pastoral property owner, and his overseer "Darkie", also a white man. In this account, Grantley and Darkie shoot a group of Aboriginal people in response to attacks on shepherds and the killing of stock. The story says that 10–12 Aboriginal people were killed in the massacre, and many more wounded. The bodies are burnt. The police investigate, and Darkie, not wanting to implicate his employer, flees the district on Grantley's prize horse, using his bush skills to elude his pursuers. He swims the horse across the mouth of the Murray River, then finds passage on a whaling ship off Kangaroo Island. This account, though using fictional names, essentially retold basic known facts of the case against Brown.

In Rodney Cockburn's 1927 book, The Pastoral Pioneers of South Australia, Brown was described as a great benefactor, whose deceased estate had been used by his widow to establish "two great charitable institutions", the Kalyra Consumptive Home at Belair, and Estcourt House Convalescent Home at Grange. Cockburn remarked on the lack of publicity enjoyed by Brown, and explained that he had "received a severe set back" early in his career after being accused of "poisoning a blackfellow". He went on to claim that Brown was found not guilty of the murder by a jury, and defended Brown's reputation, stating that the poisoning incident was part and parcel of "the circumstances and conditions of the day". Foster et al. note that there is no evidence of Brown being involved in a poisoning, despite poisonings of Aboriginal people by white settlers having occurred in the southeast of the colony prior to Brown's arrival. They further note Brown also only ever appeared in court on one matter, that of the shooting of the Aboriginal group in 1848, which never went to trial. They surmise that the shooting may have become mixed up in some people's minds with a poisoning that occurred on the west coast of the colony in the same year which also received significant press coverage.

In 1939, Clement Smith, the Member of Parliament for the electoral district of Victoria, which covered much of the southeast of the now state of South Australia, mentioned Brown during a speech in State Parliament. He stated that the story was in Paving the Way, referred to "many natives" being slaughtered, and related that he had personally seen "large quantities of bones of those natives" when crossing the swamps where they were shot down. He then spoke of Brown making an epic pony ride from his station to Adelaide, swimming across the Murray, to report to the police to meet his bail conditions. Foster et al. note that although Smith was telling the story to illustrate violence against Aboriginal people on the frontier in the context of a parliamentary debate about giving Aboriginal people greater rights, he turned it instead into "an account of a pioneer's heroic horse ride". They also note that while Smith may well have seen bones, they could not have been those of Brown's victims, as they had been collected as evidence by Moorhouse and it is highly unlikely they were returned to the scene.

In 1944, a local historian, J. G. Hastings, wrote a manuscript, entitled The History of the Coorong, which proved influential in the development of the legend of James Brown. In it, Hastings elaborated on the poisoning incident in which Brown had supposedly been involved. By this account, Brown, responding to repeated attacks on his livestock, poisoned some flour and left it accessible to local Aboriginal people, who subsequently stole the flour and ate it, many dying as a result. Having set the trap, Brown then rode for Adelaide to establish an alibi, swimming across the Murray Mouth on his way. According to Hastings, when the case was investigated by the police, Brown's ride to Adelaide "set him in good stead". Hastings wrote that at Brown's trial, it was claimed that it was impossible that Brown had poisoned the flour and appeared in Adelaide immediately thereafter. Hastings claimed that there was no mention of the case in police records held by archives in Adelaide, but that instead, the incident had been related to him by residents of the district who had known Brown. He also placed it as having occurred between 1860 and 1870. Foster et al. note that this date is highly unlikely, as frontier violence in the district began when squatters arrived in 1843, and was tapering off by 1848 when the murders occurred. By the 1860s, Aboriginal labour was highly sought after by pastoralists in the district due to the exodus of white labourers to the Victorian gold rush.

From the 1950s onwards, stories about Brown were often included in local histories of the southeast of South Australia. Examples include Elma Smith's History of Kingston published in 1950, and an account by local historian Verne McLaren in Kingston Flashbacks published in 1970. In Smith's version, the original crime was not discussed, and the focus was on the horse ride to Adelaide, and McLaren's account split the legend into two, one about a poisoning by Brown, and another in which Brown and an accomplice cornered Aboriginal people in the Papineau caves, smoked them out and shot them. The second of McLaren's stories ended with Brown's famous ride to Adelaide to report to the police. Another account was included in Barry Durman's A History of the Baker's Range Settlement, published in 1978. Durman reproduced a newspaper article about the investigation into Brown's involvement in the murders, passed over the manner by which the murders were carried out and stated that the case was not proven, and then told of a "wonderful feat of horsemanship" by Brown.

Aboriginal versions of the story also exist. In 1987, an elderly Aboriginal man from nearby Kingston related a version of the story, in which Brown shot some Aboriginal people and poisoned others because they were stealing his sheep. Brown then established his alibi by riding to Adelaide. In the same year Hastings' account was reproduced verbatim in Tom McCourt and Hans Mincham's The Coorong and Lakes of the Lower Murray. Three years later, the South Australian Education Department published an Aboriginal studies book for secondary students. It repeated Hastings' version, and followed it with an Aboriginal version told by a Ngarrindjeri man, George Trevorrow, whose family were from the Guichen Bay area. Trevorrow described the exploitation of Aboriginal workers by white settlers, and stated that when times were lean, Aboriginal people would steal flour from landowners. He did not name Brown, but stated that a settler poisoned some flour and rode for Adelaide to establish an alibi. Foster et al. note that although these two accounts were similar, the difference was that Hastings portrayed Brown as a victim of Aboriginal attacks, while Trevorrow emphasised white exploitation of Aboriginal people.

As of 2022, the James Brown Memorial Trust, which was formed from Brown's estate and incorporated by Act of Parliament in December 1894, continues to operate under the name Kalyra Communities as an aged care service provider in South Australia. Manning's Place Names of South Australia records that "Kalyra" is the "native name of Mr James Brown's station in the South-East better known as Avenue Range station. It is the Aboriginal name for a certain kind of wood from which the natives made spears and other weapons."

== Evolution of the story ==
Foster et al. argue that it is unlikely there were two incidents, a shooting that was investigated, and a poisoning that was not, because Brown's appearance before the court is common to both stories, but is known to have only occurred in the case of the shooting murders. They advance the view that even if both incidents did occur, the original story of the shooting murders has been transformed through the filter of the "pioneer legend" into one where Brown is remembered not for committing an atrocity, but for an epic horse ride. This transformation included the morphing of a cold-blooded shooting into a sly and passive "set and forget" poisoning, where the Aboriginal victims are "complicit in their own demise" by stealing the flour. They arrive at the judgement that, by focussing on a poisoning rather than a shooting, the story plays down the seriousness of the crime. Further, they observe that the murder of Aboriginal people effectively became a plot device, while the horse ride became central to the legend. They conclude that the evolution of the story is "testament to the influence of the 'pioneer legend' in shaping White Australia's view of the past".
