= James Brown (Australian pastoralist) =

Scottish pastoralist

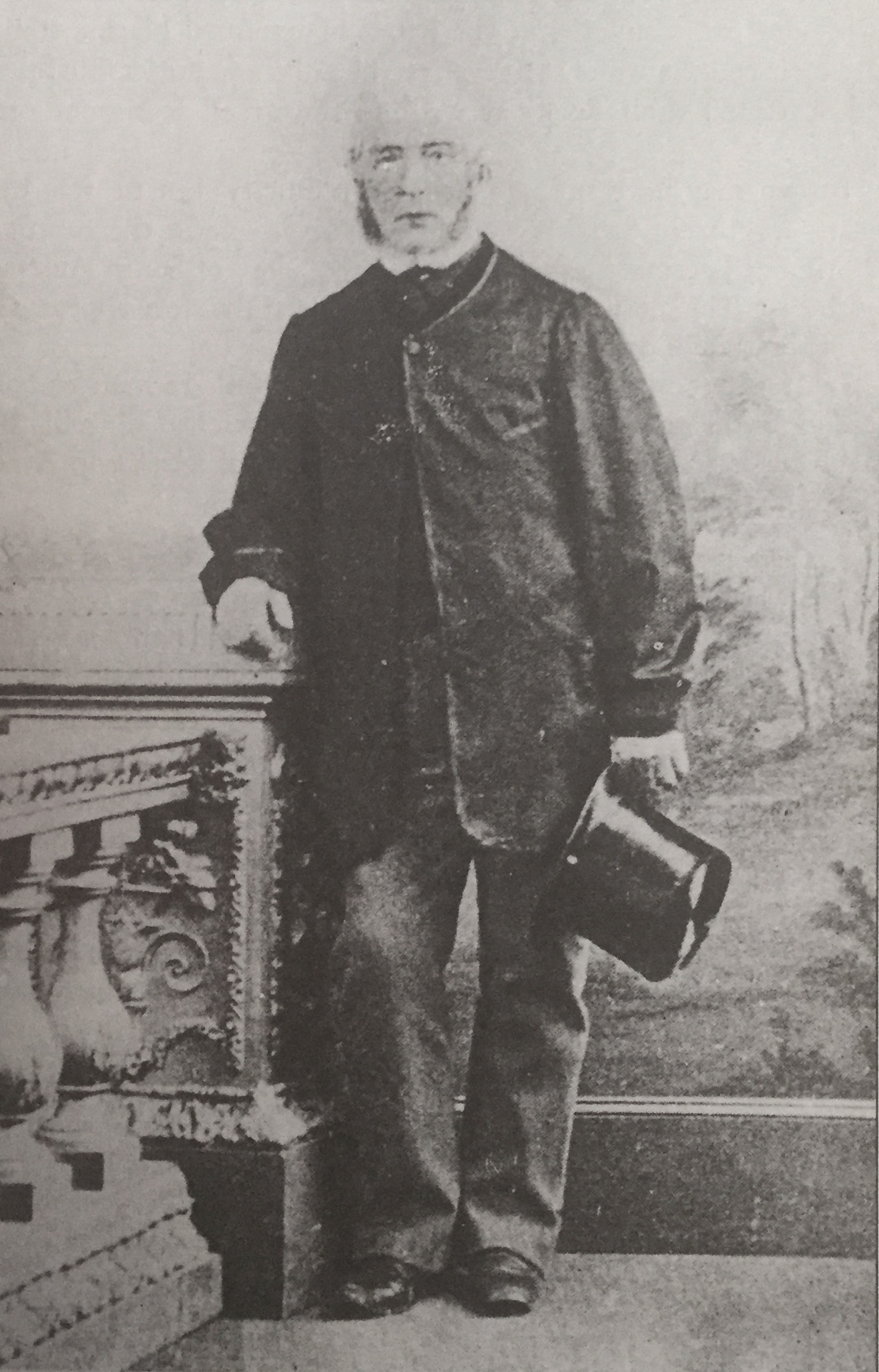
- Born: c. 1819; East Fife, Scotland
- Died: 7 February 1890 (aged 70–71); South Australia, Australia
- Occupation: Pastoralist
- Known for: Mass murder, Avenue Range Station massacre
- Spouse: Jessie Brown

James Brown (c. 1819 – 7 February 1890) was a Scottish-born mass murderer and pastoralist of the South East of South Australia responsible for the Avenue Range Station massacre of between nine and eleven Aboriginal Australians. He was never convicted, despite the magistrate who committed him for trial observing that there was "little question of the butchery or the butcher". The Aboriginal Witnesses Act specified that a court could not base a conviction of a white man on the testimony of an Aboriginal witness alone. After his death, his widow Jessie Brown pursued several philanthropic ventures in his name. Two charitable institutions — the Kalyra Consumption Sanitorium at Belair and Estcourt House, near Grange were founded in his memory, and out of the proceeds of his estate.

== Life ==
James Brown was born in East Fife, Scotland, and in company with his brother, Archibald, left Liverpool on the barque Fairfield on 1 November 1838. After a wearisome voyage of 185 days they arrived in South Australia on 4 May 1839. In 1840 they settled in Allendale in the Hindmarsh River valley, the owners of 640 sheep. By 1844 they owned 1,290 ewes, 14 cattle, 6 pigs and 14 acres of wheat. In 1849 Brown moved to the South East where he founded the Avenue Range station consisting of 69 square miles of country, which was secured for an annual rental of 10/ per square mile. The area was subsequently enlarged to 83 square miles, some 50 miles north-east of Guichen Bay where the wool was shipped. The greater portion of it was covered with water during the winter, and the stock suffered from footrot and coast disease. Brown built a ten-room stone house with a verandah. The sheep were shepherded until June 1864, when Avenue Range and his other leases were fenced at a cost of £6,000. Soon he had 24,000 sheep besides cattle and horses. Another name for the Avenue Range run was Kalyra, a native word meaning 'hop bush'.

A drawback to this property was the volume of public traffic passing over the run. It lay on the overland route to Melbourne and Mount Gambier, and about 60,000 sheep crossed the best part of the station during the first three months of every year. Bullock teams passing from Victoria and the Tatiara district were continually breaking gates and pulling over the posts. Accordingly, Brown had posts at one gate put eight feet into the ground, and awaited the arrival of the next delinquent. Before long a teamster appeared, and carelessly ran a wheel against one of these deeply embedded posts. It would not budge, and much to Brown's delight, the "bullocky" had to take out his team and pull the waggon back. Retribution followed, and Brown later had the mortification of finding that his stout posts had been burnt to the ground.

=== Avenue Range Station massacre ===
Location of Avenue Range Station within South Australia

In 1849, Brown was charged with having murdered "unknown aboriginal natives", estimated at between nine and eleven victims. The date of the massacre is unclear. Moorhouse's original report in March 1849 stated that it had occurred some months before, and in his published report of October 1849, he placed it "about September" of 1848. On 19 February, the Protector of Aborigines, Matthew Moorhouse arrived in the district to investigate reports that some Aboriginal people had been murdered near Guichen Bay. An Aboriginal witness, Leandermin, took Moorhouse to the site of the alleged crime. He told Moorhouse that, on the day the killings occurred, he and a white man named Parker were walking along a road when they heard shots. He went to see what was happening and, from behind some trees, saw four or five Aboriginal women lying on the ground with fresh wounds. He also saw others on the ground, whom he presumed were dead because they were not moving. Two white men were present. Leandermin identified Brown as one of them, and stated that he had seen Brown standing over the victims with a gun in his hand. Brown's overseer, Eastwood, was suspected of being his accomplice. Moorhouse's party then located five holes containing human remains. Scattered nearby they found human bones and cartridge paper discharged from a firearm. Eighty paces from the graves they located the remains of a fire which contained more bones. Moorhouse concluded that the bodies had first been buried, but later exhumed and burnt in an attempt to destroy the evidence.

In late March or early April he appeared before a local magistrate in the district, Captain G. V. Butler, who committed him for trial. In May, Butler wrote a letter to Charles Hervey Bagot, a member of the South Australian Legislative Council, in which he listed the victims as one "old man blind and infirm", three female adults, two teenage girls (aged 15 and 12 years), and three female children (aged two years, 18 months, and a baby). Upon hearing the case, Butler stated that there was "little question of the butchery or the butcher". Nevertheless, Brown avoided trial, though few doubted his guilt, because the provisions of the Aboriginal Witnesses Act which determined that the evidence of an "uncivilised person or persons" was considered insufficient unless corroborated by other evidence - that the court could not base the conviction of a white man on the testimony of an Aboriginal witness. Butler remained unconvinced about the strength of the prosecution, but given "great suspicion rested on the case", he gave the prosecution a further extension of time, and released Brown on bail of £500.

In July 1849, the South Australian Advocate General produced a summary of the investigation to date. Several difficulties were detailed, including the fact that Parker denied any knowledge of the crime, as did others who were believed to have heard the incident, discussed in Brown's presence. Brown's co-accused, Eastwood, alias "Yorkie", had fled when the investigation began and had apparently left the colony aboard a whaling ship off Kangaroo Island. An important witness named Joice had gone to the neighbouring Port Phillip District of the colony of New South Wales, and Leandermin himself, who it appears was being detained at Guichen Bay, absconded and had allegedly been "made away with". The remaining witnesses were those that knew Brown, and apparently would not give evidence against him. Despite the extremely difficult task faced by the prosecution under these circumstances, the Advocate General ordered that investigations continue and issued warrants for the arrest of those that had fled South Australia. Brown appeared at the Supreme Court yet again on 10 and 28 September, but the judge again refused to hear the case without further evidence. By the November sittings of the court, Brown's case had been removed from the listings, and this was the end of the matter as far as the formal investigation was concerned. Effectively, settler solidarity and the law of evidence ensured that Brown was never tried for the murders, despite the fact that those involved in the investigation had no doubt of his guilt. Possibly in response to Brown's case, the Aboriginal Witnesses Act of 1848 was amended in July 1849 to allow a person to be convicted on the sole testimony of an Aboriginal person.

=== Retirement ===
Brown's total holdings in the South East covered 183 square miles, and he prospered exceedingly. In 1874 he retired to "Waverley House" in Glen Osmond, where he died aged 71. He had been a colonist of 51 years, and his residence in South Australia had been broken only by one short visit to San Francisco, where he had property interests. His wife Jessie (ca. 1826 – 13 November 1892) died at Niagara Falls, which she was visiting in company with a niece, Miss Dougall. They left no family. James Brown was buried in West Terrace Cemetery, Adelaide, and perhaps his wife also.

== Philanthropic uses of his estate ==
Prior to leaving Adelaide Mrs Brown called upon a close friend, Adam Adamson Jr (1821 – 20 January 1898), and indicated her desire to found a charitable institution in memory of her late husband. Mr Adamson suggested a home for crippled children, together with a convalescent home for the poor. When Mrs Brown later died, it was announced in the press that between £60,000 and £100,000 had been left by her for this purpose. The James Brown Memorial Trust was formed, and incorporated by an act of Parliament in December 1894. Adamson was the first chairman of the trust, which was composed of noted members of many religious denominations. Estcourt House, near Grange, was purchased for £3,000 as a home for the aged blind and crippled children. It was built and named in 1882 by F. Estcourt Bucknall, whose well-appointed yacht used to lie within pistol shot of the mansion, where great hospitality was dispensed. 'Kalyra' at Belair was also purchased for £4,000, and the Goode and McBride wings were added subsequently to the building. Sir Charles Goode, one of the trustees, helped to place the institution on a satisfactory basis, and Kalyra and Estcourt House and the Trust have continued to operate through the years.

== See also ==
- List of massacres of Indigenous Australians
- Maria (brigantine)
- Matthew Moorhouse

== Sources ==
- Foster, Robert; Nettelbeck, Amanda (2012). Out of the Silence: The History and Memory of South Australia's Frontier Wars. Kent Town, South Australia: Wakefield Press. ISBN 978-1-74305-172-6.
- "Law and Police Courts". South Australian Register. Vol. XIII, no. 950. South Australia. 20 June 1849. p. 3.
- "Law and Police Courts". South Australian Register. Vol. XIII, no. 974. South Australia. 12 September 1849. p. 3.
- "Thursday, 11th September". South Australian Register. Vol. XIII, no. 979. South Australia. 29 September 1849. p. 3.
- "Law and Police Courts". South Australian Register. Vol. XIII, no. 996. South Australia. 28 November 1849. p. 4.
- Ordinance 4 (PDF). 25 July 1849.
