= Cape Jaffa Lighthouse =

Lighthouse in South Australia

Cape Jaffa Lighthouse (museum)
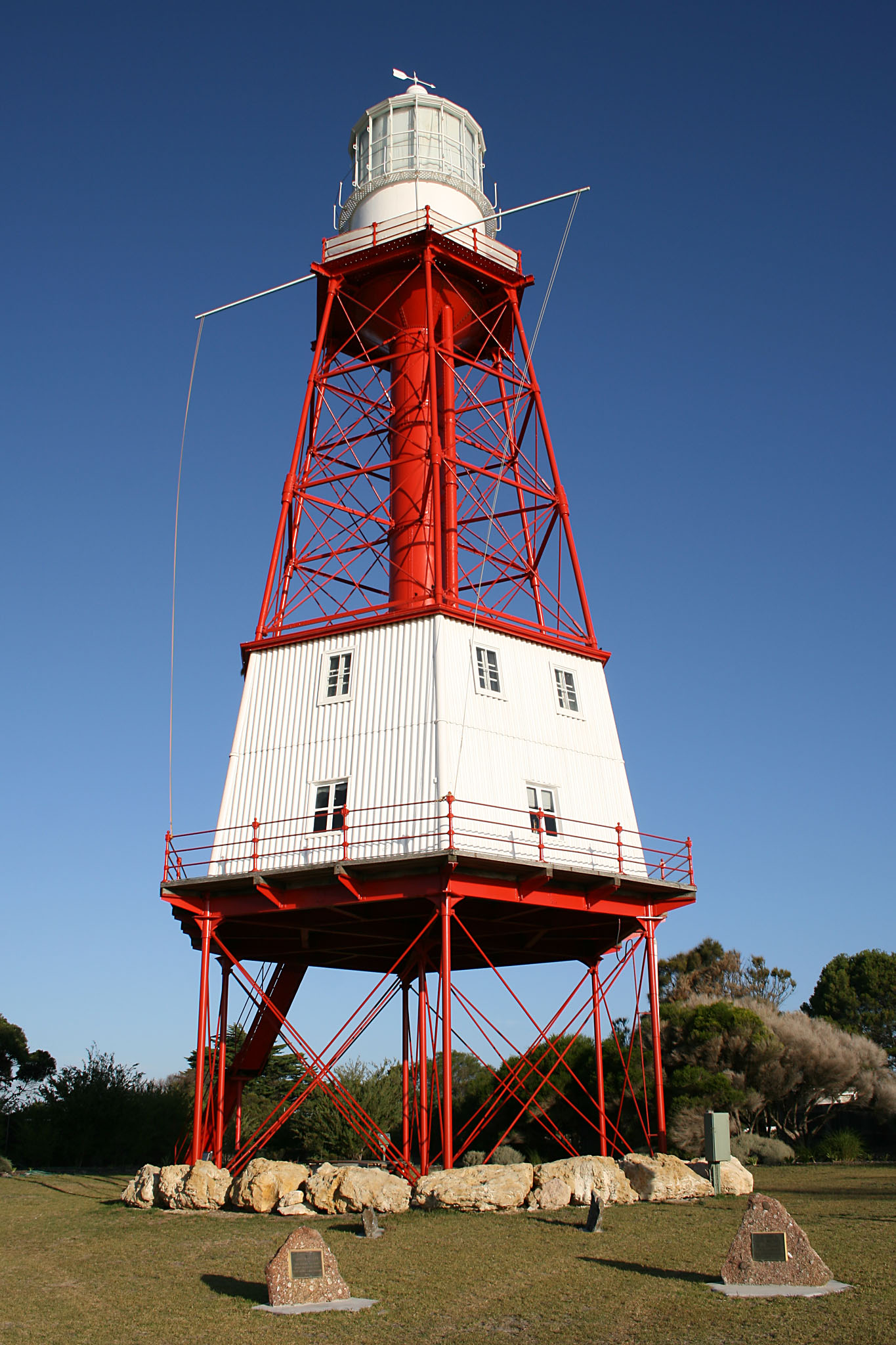
- Cape Jaffa Lighthouse

- Location within South Australia

General information
- Location: Kingson SE; South Australia, Australia
- Coordinates: 36°50′09″S 139°50′47″E
- Construction started: 1976
- Completed: 1976

Cape Jaffa Lighthouse is a decommissioned lighthouse formerly located on Margaret Brock Reef near Cape Jaffa on the southeast coast of South Australia and whose tower has been located in the town of Kingston SE since 1976. The former lighthouse tower is owned by the National Trust of South Australia, which operates it as a museum. The platform which supported the tower is still in place at Margaret Brock Reef as of 2022.

== History ==
The lighthouse was designed by George Wells, and the components made at Chance Brothers in Smethwick in the West Midlands area of England. The parts were packed up and sent to Australia, and reconstructed at Cape Jaffa. All in all it took three years to build and was opened on 6 January 1872. It was originally built 8 km (5.0 mi) out to sea from Cape Jaffa on the Margaret Brock Reef. One particular shipwreck, the SS Admella was cited at the time as the reason for commissioning the lighthouse.

Known as a Wells screw pile, (Note: Named for George Wells, licensee of Mitchell's screw pile patent. Percy Wells, a brother, was his agent in South Australia and also involved in the Tiparra Reef lighthouse.) the original structure was held secure by being screwed into the ocean/reefs rocks. It was 41 m (135 ft) high and was designed to suit the local conditions. In its original structure, the lighthouse had eight rooms, enough to accommodate two lighthouse keepers and their families with enough stores to last several weeks. The lighthouse used a Chance Brothers lantern which could be seen for a distance up to 40 km (25 mi).

The federal government installed an automatic light to the structure in the early 1970s and handed operation to the National Trust of South Australia. After almost 101 years of use, the lighthouse was deactivated in 1973 when a new lighthouse at Robe began operation.

The lighthouse was listed on the now-defunct Register of the National Estate on 21 March 1978 and on the South Australian Heritage Register on 24 July 1980.

The structure on which the lighthouse tower originally stood still stands as of 2022. It currently hosts a breeding colony of Australasian gannets.

== Lighthouse keepers ==
When the lighthouse was first in service there were three keepers on duty at the lighthouse and one at the shore station. The keepers rotated so that they had one month ashore followed by three on the lighthouse. The shore keeper maintained the lighthouse cottages and monitored the radio.

Charles Henry West served as a lighthouse keeper at Cape Jaffa Lighthouse during the period 1893-1919, as well as Troubridge Island Lighthouse and South Neptune Island Lighthouse. Prior to this, he was a customs officer at Port Adelaide. At the age of 44, he married Emma Isabella Germein, daughter of Samuel Germein, at Baptist Church Manse, Adelaide.

== Visiting ==
The lighthouse tower was moved to its present location in Kingston SE in 1976, where it became a museum. It is open during South Australian school holidays.

The museum is set up to show how lighthouse keepers and their families lived in the tower structure. There is a log cabin quilt on one of the beds that is on the National Quilt Register. An interactive display telling the tragic story of the 1852 shipwreck of the barque Margaret Brock was opened in 2016.

== See also ==
- List of lighthouses in Australia
- List of National Trust properties in Australia
- MS Oliva
