= Deadly Nannas =

Australian musical group

Deadly Nannas (Nragi Muthar) is a musical group from Murray Bridge, South Australia, founded around 2016.

The group of singer-songwriters is composed primarily of Ngarrindjeri women (with two kringkri ma:dawar, or white sisters), and performs as a vocal ensemble with a backing track. The group was formed in 2017 with the goal of writing and performing songs in Ngarrindjeri for the preservation and promotion of that language and culture. The women have all have completed a tertiary course in learning an endangered Aboriginal language, which helps them to use a fusion of Ngarrindjeri and English. Several of the Aboriginal members of the group grew up speaking their language at home, but not being permitted to speak it anywhere else. Some of the group were affected by the family break-ups caused by government policies, known as the Stolen Generations.

The group's spokesperson is Georgina Trevorrow, with the other members as of 2020 being Diana Murphy, Vicki Hartman, Lena Rigney, Pauline Walker, Bec Gollan, Vicki Cummings and Phyliss Williams.

They have performed at a range of cultural events, including Mii Pudnanthi at the Adelaide Showground, and travelled around Australia. In March 2021 they performed at the Adelaide Fringe, and in 2019, the group was a finalist in the Premier's NAIDOC Award, a South Australian award presented during NAIDOC Week.

As of 2019, the group had released three CDs, including their debut Ngarrindjeri Lullaby (2017) and self-titled Deadly Nannas (2019). In March 2020, the Deadly Nannas released their first music video, for the song "Celebrating Culture", which was dedicated to one of the group members who had died before the video had been completed.

As of 2021, the Deadly Nannas are taking part in a South Australian school singing program, in an effort to boost the numbers of Ngarrindjeri-speakers from the 312 reported in the 2016 Australian census. For Ngarrindjeri children, connecting to language is part of an effort to boost their social and physical well-being, by connecting to country and culture.
