= Warburto Point =

Warburto Point South Australia
- Coordinates: 34°0′33″S 137°30′29″E
- Elevation: 6.1 m (20 ft)
- Location: 12 km (7 mi) south west of Wallaroo
Localities around Warburto Point:
Spencer Gulf	Spencer Gulf	Yorke Peninsula
Spencer Gulf	Warburto Point	Yorke Peninsula
Spencer Gulf	Spencer Gulf	Yorke Peninsula

Warburto Point is a headland located on the west coast of the Yorke Peninsula in South Australia about 12 kilometres (7.5 miles) south west of the town of Wallaroo. The point is described by one source as being ‘a rocky projection that extends about 1.5 nautical miles (2.8 kilometres; 1.7 miles) W(est) from the mainland’ and that ‘it is 6.1 metres (20 feet) high and is fringed by mangroves along each of its sides.’ The land at the tip of the point has been part of the Bird Islands Conservation Park since 1972. Since 1995, it has been the site of a navigation aid in the form of a light tower which was commissioned to replace the lighthouse on Tiparra Reef. It is also the site of a coastal weather station operated by the Australian Bureau of Meteorology.
