= Bernouilli Conservation Reserve =

Protected area in South Australia

- IUCN category VI (protected area with sustainable use of natural resources)
- Location within South Australia
- Location: South Australia, Cape Jaffa
- Nearest city: Kingston SE.
- Coordinates: 36°58′21″S 139°41′9″E
- Area: 2.66 km^{2} (1.03 sq mi)
- Established: 11 November 1993
- Governing body: Department of Environment, Water and Natural Resources

Bernouilli Conservation Reserve is a protected area located in the Australian state of South Australia in the gazetted locality of Cape Jaffa about 21 kilometres (13 miles) south west of the township of Kingston SE in the state's Limestone Coast region. The conservation reserve was proclaimed under the Crown Lands Act 1929 on 11 November 1993. The name is derived from Cap Bernouilli, the former name of the headland of Cape Jaffa. The conservation reserve is classified as an IUCN Category VI protected area.

== See also ==
- Protected areas of South Australia
- Conservation reserves of South Australia
