= Margaret Brock Reef =

South Australian reef

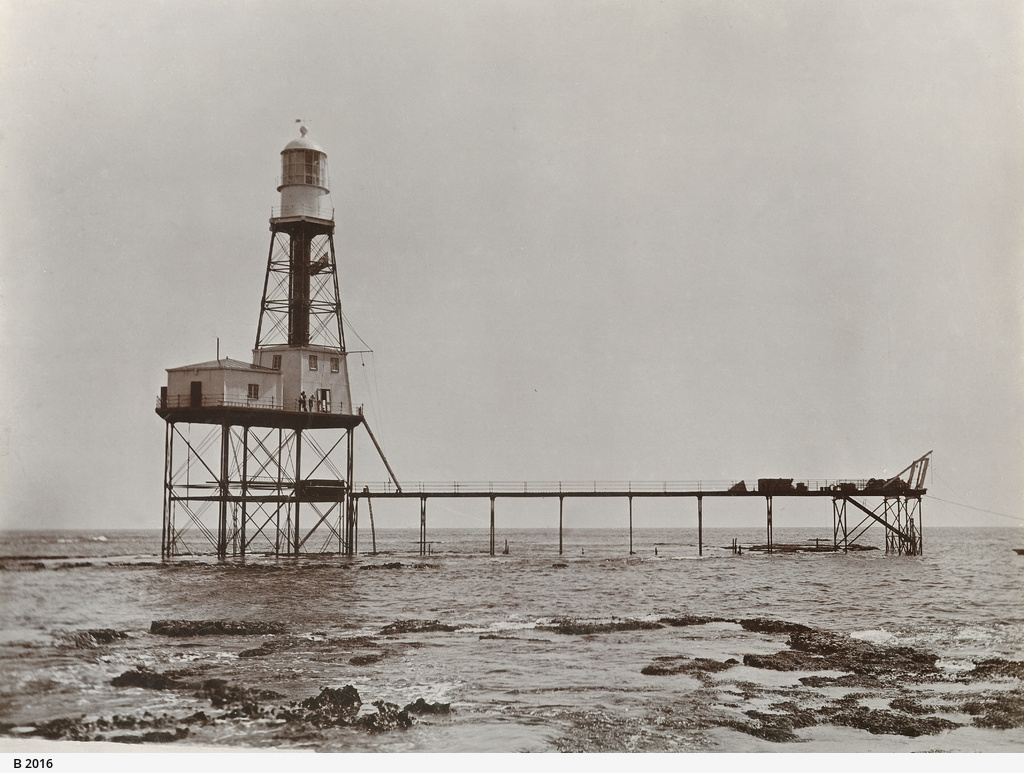
- Cape Jaffa Lighthouse (circa 1910) showing the full lighthouse installation standing on the reef. The lantern room and keepers accommodation on the left hand side of the image were removed during the 1970s.

- Location within South Australia

Geography
- Location: Limestone Coast, South Australia
- Coordinates: 36°57′07″S 139°35′44″E
- Highest elevation: 2 m (7 ft)

Administration
- Australia

Margaret Brock Reef is a reef in the Australian state of South Australia located in the state's coastal waters on its south-east coast about 7 kilometres (4.3 mi) west of the headland of Cape Jaffa and about 27.2 kilometres (16.9 mi) south-west of the town of Kingston SE. It is the site of both a navigation aid which operated as a staffed lighthouse from 1872 to 1973 and as an automatic beacon onward to the present day, and a rock lobster sanctuary declared under state law in 1973. It is named after the barque Margaret Brock which was wrecked there in 1852.

== Description ==
Margaret Brock Reef is located about 7 kilometres (4.3 mi) west of the headland of Cape Jaffa and about 27.2 kilometres (16.9 mi) southwest of the town of Kingston SE.

The reef stands above a seabed located above the 10 metres (33 ft) depth contour and parts of it are above sea-level at low tide. The portion of the reef which is shown on a chart published in one source as being shallower than 2 metres (6 ft 7 in) depth extends for about 5 nautical miles (9.3 km) in a north–south direction with the northern end being located about 3 nautical miles (5.6 km) north of the former lighthouse platform. At low tide, the highest part of the reef can dry to a height of 2 metres (6 ft 7 in) above sea-level.

== Formation, geology and oceanography ==
Margaret Brock Reef was formed about 6000 to 7000 years ago by rising sea level. The reef and two islands to its south, Baudin Rocks and Penguin Island, are remnants of a former dune system known as the Robe Range which extended from what is now Cape Jaffa to what is now Cape Banks in the south. The range is composed of a "crumbly rock" known as Bridgewater Formation calcarenite which is described in some sources as being aeolianite.

One source describes the reef as being "an extensive danger" because of the presence of water depths less than 3.6 metres (12 ft), and because a vessel's crew may not see the reef's edge as waves may not break there and as the sea for a distance up to 5 nautical miles (9.3 km) to the reef's west will form waves in stormy weather that break.

== History ==
=== European discovery ===
Margaret Brock Reef was seen by the Baudin expedition in April 1802. In 1826, Sesostris, a ship carrying convicts to the colony of New South Wales and under the command of a Captain Drake sighted the reef on the way to Sydney. The barque Margaret Brock was wrecked on the reef on 23 November 1852. A chart prepared by Thomas Lipson, the South Australian Government harbor master, showing the location of the reefs to the west of Cape Jaffa including Margaret Brock Reef as well as the location of the wreck of Margaret Brock was published in South Australian Government Gazette on 7 April 1853.

=== Naming ===
The name "Sesostris Reef" was used for the reef from 1826 onwards to at least the late 1870s. In particular, it was used in one publication, The Australian Directory, until 1878, but was replaced by the name "Margaret Brock Reef" in the 1879 edition. The name "Margaret Brock Reef" was in use in South Australia by 1865.

=== Shipwrecks ===
Ships wrecked on the reef include the brigantine Maria in 1840, the barque Margaret Brock in 1852, the schooner Agnes in 1865, the fishing vessel Thunderbird in 1964 and the fishing vessel Explorer in 1977.

=== Navigation aids ===
The Cape Jaffa Lighthouse, also called the Margaret Brock Reef lighthouse in some sources, was built on part of the reef which is dry at low tide. Construction commenced in 1868 and the light was first used in January 1872. In 1973, its role was degraded after the commissioning of a new lighthouse at Robe. In 1975, the portion of the structure consisting of the lantern room and the keepers' accommodation was dismantled and re-erected in Kingston SE for use by the National Trust of South Australia as a museum. The platform remaining on the reef now accommodates an automatic beacon and is known as the Margaret Brock Reef Light.

== Protected area status and other designations ==
Margaret Brock Reef is the site of a sanctuary where fishing for southern rock lobster is prohibited at all times. It was originally proclaimed in 1973 to amend an earlier statute, the state's Fisheries Act 1971, and subsequently was re-proclaimed under the state's Fisheries Management Act 2007. The sanctuary occupies the area within a radius of 1 kilometre (0.62 mi) of the navigation aid located on the former lighthouse platform. The rock lobster sanctuary was listed as a marine protected area from 2008 to 2014 on the Australian government's Collaborative Australian Protected Area Database (CAPAD).
