= Jarildekald people =

Indigenous people of South Australia

The Jarildekald people, also known as Yarilde or Yaralde, are an Aboriginal Australian people of South Australia originating on the eastern side of Lake Alexandrina and the Murray River.

== Name ==
The tribal name Jarildekald is said to derive from Jarawalangan, a phrase meaning "Where shall we go?" referring to a tradition according to which on migrating from the interior to the mouth of the Murray, the tribe at that point was perplexed as to where they were to continue their travels. They were grouped as the Ngarrindjeri by the early ethnographer George Taplin, though Norman Tindale and others have argued that while his data refer predominantly to the Jarildekald, it would be mistaken to confuse them with the Narinndjeri.

In 2019, law professor Irene Watson wrote in an article about the Maria massacre: "The ancient identity and name of the Milmendjeri, one of the Tanganekald peoples, belong to the Coorong. They are ancient names that have become almost lost to living memory. Post-invasion, the peoples and territories of the Coorong have become known as Ngarrindjeri — this name is now privileged in native title claims over the lands and affairs of traditional First Nations nations such as Ramindjeri, Tanganekald, and Yaralde."

== Language ==
Their dialect of Ngarrindjeri is known as Yarildewallin (Jaralde speech).

== Country ==
The lands of the Jarildekald extended over some 1,300 square kilometres (500 sq mi). They were located on the eastern side of Lake Alexandrina and the Murray River. Their territory runs from Loveday Bay on the Narrung Peninsula to Mobilong, and east to Meningie and the Cookes Plains.

== Alternative names ==
- Jaralde (short form)
- Lakalinyeri (group at Point McLeay)
- Piccanini Murray people
- Warawalde (a northern group at Nalpa)
- Yalawarre
- Yarilde, Yaralde, Yarrildie, Jaraldi, Yarildewallin (Jaralde speech)

== People ==
According to Tindale, the Jarildekald people consisted of over 15 groups. A. R. Radcliffe-Brown provided a list, which he said was incomplete, totalling 22 groups:

Clan name	Totems
Luŋundinďerar.	morinďeriorn.(White-bellied sea eagle),(?)ťeniťeri.(seagull),(tern?);
Kaŋaninďerar.	(?)kalu, a type of bird. (?)wankeri (mullet-like fish);
Kandukari.	(?)ťeniťeri.;
Retirinďerar.	waiyi (brown snake), wiruri (spider);
Manäŋkar.	rakalde (water-rat), kinkindili (small back turtle);
Liwurinďerar.	nguari pelican, tukuri (silver bream);
Milinďerar.	rakalde(water-rat), kinkindili )small turtle);
Turarorn.	turi (coot);
Yedawulinďerar.	panki (water plant), maińŋuni (stinging nettle);
Tumbalinďerar.	
Wuraltinďerar.	kunŋari (swan);
Kinarinďerar.	paraŋuwaťeri (snake);
Krapinďerar.	peláŋe (small butterfish), karaiyi (snake), puŋkalateri (prickly lizard);
Paraigelďerar.	tukuri (silver bream);
Yukinďerar.	piuwińi (hawk);
Limpinďerar.	waldi (hot weather);
Wutsautinďerar/Waltarpularorn.	waldi (hot weather), waltarwaltarińeri (a small bird);
Raŋurinďerar.	keli (wild dog of dark hue), kalari (sleepy lizard);
Mulberaperar/Mulberapinďerar.	noŋkulauri (mountain duck);
Yankinďerar.	nowari (pelican), pomeri (catfish), përi (hawk), tuyuŋui (monitor lizard);
Karatinďerar.	wild dog of light hue;
Piltinďerar.	pomeri (catfish)
