= Mulbarapa =

Aboriginal clan in Australia

The Mulbarapa are one of the 22 known clans of the Yaraldi branch of the Ngarrindjeri.

== Homeland ==
Mulbarapa country extends along the Lake Alexandrina shoreline from Poikangk to Pemandang Bluff. The Berndts describe it as follows:

From the Bluff, the boundary skirted a native track to Lalanganggel (Mt Misery)... The boundary extends south-east to north of Albert Hill, then north-east of Kutingwar and northwards to a point north by north-east of Minmulewar. South-east of Minmulewar, passing Trewunang Swamp (Note: trewari means shag) This stretched from Trewunang to Punguldulin, with scrubland on its western border.

The site at Pemandang was where legend held it that the dreamtime culture hero Ngurunderi, having minced Pondi(Ponde - Murray cod), stepped ashore from his bark canoe. Until relatively modern times, before they were broken, the shape of footprints on stones here were pointed out as those of Ngurunderi. Likewise, two sandhills at Lalangange marked his former campsite there. Punguldulin was the place of the kangaroo rat.

== Flora and fauna ==
Mulbarapa country was well supplied with game, with great numbers of tulatji (wallaby), wangyumi (kangaroo), pindjuli (emu), wiruringguri (mallee hen) and talkundjeri (wild turkey) available to hunters venturing through the mallee scrub back of Pemandang.

The Mulbarapa (ngatji, or totems) were the noŋkulauri, the (mountain duck) and the trewari (a black-backed and white-winged shag, which was distinguished from the larger cormorant, yoldi). As their totemic animal these could not be directly hunted, but the Mulbarapa are said to have had people from other clans hunt them, and thus obtained, they could be eaten, a practice some Ramindjeri clans would not indulge in.

kandjuri and wiloki yams and the kukindji and moronggoni potatoes were dug, while karangki (currants) and ngalaii (yacca grass honey) were gathered. Poikangk Bay afforded the Mulbarapa excellent fishing.

== Traditions and ceremonies ==
Mulbarapa are allied to Pinpulalindjara in that these clans call each other brother and sister, irrespective of genealogical ties. Similarity of dialect who had the right to hunt over each other's territories and the obligation to stand together against aggressors in interclan fighting. Berndt wrote that the Pinpulalindjara quite likely hived off from Mulbarapa.

In the Mulbarapi clan wild dog ceremony, men danced with plain stripes painted down their legs, but they also had pipeclay stripes on their faces and dots on their chests. This was not regarded as specifically religious, although directly associated with ngatji. Possibly they were originally pre-initiatory songs and dances.

== Sources ==
- Berndt, Ronald Murray; Berndt, Catherine Helen; Stanton, John E. (1993). A World that was: The Yaraldi of the Murray River and the Lakes, South Australia. UBC Press. ISBN 978-0-774-80478-3.
- Brown, A. R. (July–December 1918). "Notes on the Social Organization of Australian Tribes". The Journal of the Royal Anthropological Institute of Great Britain and Ireland. 48: 222–253. doi:10.2307/2843422. JSTOR 2843422.
