= Bird Islands Conservation Park =

Conservation area in South Australia

- IUCN category VI (protected area with sustainable use of natural resources)
- Location within South Australia
- Location: South Australia
- Nearest city: Wallaroo
- Coordinates: 33°58′55.88″S 137°32′8.65″E
- Area: 3.58 km^{2} (1.38 sq mi)
- Established: 23 May 1968
- Governing body: Department for Environment and Water

Bird Islands Conservation Park is a 3.69-square-kilometre (1.42 sq mi) protected area in eastern Spencer Gulf, South Australia. It is located at Warburto Point on Yorke Peninsula, about 10 km (6.2 mi) south of the town of Wallaroo. In 1991, land additions were made to the park to include the intertidal zone of both islands. In 1999, a larger, mainland section was added to support mangroves, samphire and coastal fringe vegetation.

== Vegetation ==
The two islands forming Bird Islands Conservation Park are fringed by grey mangrove (Avicennia marina ssp. marina) woodlands and chenopod shrublands. A tall open shrubland of coast daisy-bush (Olearia axillaris) and grasslands of introduced species occur on the sandy, higher ground. The mainland section of the park at Warburto Point is similar but with some sandy beach areas backed by dunes supporting coast daisy-bush and various Acacia spp. shrublands. Nine native plant species have been recorded in this park.

== Wildlife ==
Australia is party to international agreements regarding the conservation of migratory birds (Japan-Australia and China-Australia Migratory Bird Agreements) and several of these migrant shorebirds (listed under JAMBA and CAMBA treaties) regularly visit Bird Islands Conservation Park. These are known to include sharp-tailed sandpiper, red knot, red-necked stint, greater sand plover, grey-tailed tattler, Caspian tern and Terek sandpiper.

Additional birds of conservation significance recorded in the park include: Cape Barren goose, lesser sand plover, pied oystercatcher, rock parrot, eastern osprey and fairy tern.

== Access ==
The park can be accessed by car along Warburto Road. The islands can be reached by wading out at low tide or by boat at high tide. Limited 4WD access is available via a network of sandy tracks.

== Activities ==
In keeping with the park's conservation zoning, public use is restricted to low-impact activities compatible with the protection of natural and cultural values. Walking, interpretation and education, scientific research and nature appreciation are permitted using existing tracks and trails within the zone. Kayaking is also possible around Bird Islands. Beach fishing is permitted in the waters off Bird Island Conservation Park, provided it is not occurring within a Marine Park Sanctuary Zone.

== Threats ==
The Government of South Australia's Department of the Environment, Water and Natural Resources has suggested 4WD use should be monitored, as environmental damage can result from driving vehicles on the beach. As the Copper Coast District Council area's human population increases, the impacts from 4WD and other visitor impacts will also increase and will require management.
