= Sesostris (1818 ship) =

UK merchant ship and convict transport 1818–1843

History

United Kingdom
- Name: Sesostris
- Namesake: Sesostris
- Builder: James Shepherd, Paull, Hull
- Cost: £12,175
- Launched: 2 March 1818
- Fate: Broken up in 1843

General characteristics
- Tons burthen: 488, or 48837/94, or 500 (bm)
- Length: 119 ft 8 in (36.5 m)
- Beam: 30 ft 5 in (9.3 m)
- Armament: 6 guns (1829)

Sesostris was launched at Hull in 1818. She traded with India, the Baltic, and Russia, carried troops for a Chilean military expedition against Peru, and transported convicts to New South Wales. She was broken up in 1843.

== Career ==
Sesostris first appeared in Lloyd's Register (LR) in 1818 with Thompson, master, Staniforth, owner, and trade Hull–Bengal.

In 1813 the British East India Company (EIC) had lost its monopoly on the trade between India and Britain. British ships were then free to sail to India or the Indian Ocean under a license from the EIC.

Sesostris, Thompson, master, arrived at Yarmouth on 18 May 1818 from Hull, bound for Bengal. She arrived at Madeira on 29 May and sailed for Bengal from there on 3 June. She returned to Deal on 7 October 1819, having come from Bengal via Penang and St Helena.

Reportedly her owners sold Sesostris for £6,300 after her first voyage, ship prices having collapsed. If so, this change of ownership did not show up in the registers.

Year	Master	Owner	Trade	Source
1820	Thompson	Staniforth	Hull–India	Register of Shipping (RS)
1823	Porter	Staniforth	London–Baltic	RS

Sesostris arrived at Archangel on 6 July 1822. On 24 September Sesostris, Porter, master, from Archangel, ran ashore in the River Thames at Deptford. It was expected that she would be gotten off in the evening without damage. She was refloated that evening with little damage.

On 13 April 1823 Sesostris, Robson, master, sailed from Gravesend, bound for Valparaiso. A few days later she sailed from Deal and her destination now was Valparaiso and Lima. On 13 June she arrived at Rio de Janeiro. One of her passengers was Lady Cochrane and her family, who was sailing to Valparaiso to join her husband Lord Cochrane. As it turned out they were spared a longer journey when it turned out that he was at Rio. He had given up command of the Chilean Navy and on 21 March 1823 had taken command of the Brazilian navy.

On 2 July Sesostris, Robinson, master, sailed from Rio for Valparaiso. In Valparaiso Sesostris was one of four merchant vessels that the Chilean Navy hired to carry troops and stores for an ultimately unsuccessful expedition to Peru. (Note: The expedition consisted of the frigate Lautaro, the armed schooners Moctezuma and Mercedes, and the transports Ceres, Esther (of Liverpool, Davis, master), Santa Rosa, and Sesostris.)

On 15 September 1824 Sesostris sailed from Valparaiso to Arica. She arrived back at Valparaiso on 18 December. On 18 May 1825 Sesostris, Drake, master, arrived at Deal. She had sailed from Manila on 7 January and Saint Helena on 22 March.

Year	Master	Owner	Trade	Source
1825	Robson	Staniforth	London–Valparaiso	RS
1826	Drake	Staniforth	London–New South Wales	RS

Convict transport (1825–1826): On 28 November 1825 Sesostris, Drake, master, was at Portsmouth when Hope, which had lost her rudder, came into the harbour and ran into Sesostris, taking off Sesostris's bowsprit.

Captain J.T. Drake sailed Sesostris from Portsmouth on 30 November 1825 and arrived at Sydney on 21 March 1826. On her way she discovered a reef that became known from the 1820s to the 1870s as "Sesostris Reef", but then became known as Margaret Brock Reef. Sesostris had embarked 150 male convicts and she landed 147, having suffered three convict deaths en route. She sailed for New Zealand on 11 April.

On 5 August 1827 Captain Boucher sailed Sesostris to Bombay. Her owner was G. Watson. Then on 11 October 1829, A. Yates, master and owner, sailed Sesostris on a second voyage to Bombay. After a two-month stopover at Bombay, she sailed for Singapore and then Whampoa Anchorage.

Year	Master	Owner	Trade	Source
1830	Yates	Watson	London–CGH	Register of Shipping (RS)
1835	A[lexander] Yates		London	LR
1840	Row	Tomlin	London–Sydney	LR

Sesostris, J. Rowe, master, sailed from London on 4 May 1839 and arrived at Sydney on 31 August 1839.

== Fate ==
Sesostris was last listed in LR in 1843 with Row, master, Tomlin, owner, and trade London–Sydney. She had undergone small repairs in 1835 and had had damages repaired in 1839. The entry has the annotation "Broken Up".

== See also ==
- Margaret Brock Reef, a reef in South Australia which was known as "Sesostris Reef" from the 1820s to the 1870s.
