= Richard Penney =

Richard Penney (c. 1814 – 15 January 1844) was a pioneer medical doctor of South Australia. He enjoyed a fraternal relationship with Aboriginal tribes with whom he worked.

== History ==
Penney was a son of Richard Penney, merchant of Poole, Dorset, and his wife Benjamina Penney (c. 1793 – 4 July 1867).

He left for South Australia in September 1839 as surgeon of the barque Branken Moor (captain David Smith), (Note: Passengers included future colonists Dr and Mrs Charles Davis, Captain Alexander Tolmer (gazetted Inspector of Mounted Police) and others, some bound for Van Diemen's Land. Others who self-identified as passengers were (Anglican) Rev. Gregory Bateman, William Berry, Ann Burton and John Newington, some bound for Van Diemen's Land.) and arrived in February 1840. He found employment as surgeon to the United Fishing Company, a whaling operation working in Encounter Bay and, while in that employ, volunteered to accompany Lieutenant William Pullen, who was in the area July–August 1840 to investigate the Maria shipwreck and the subsequent murder of its passengers and crew. In a letter dated 19 April 1841, he reported to Governor Gawler that he discovered the bodies of four victims at a point called Noongong.

Penney was not involved in the August 1840 hunting down and show trial of two presumed perpetrators and consequent executions by Tolmer and O'Halloran, as authorised by Gawler.

Later reports have Penney exchanging his shirt and blanket with people of the Sekinyra tribe for a handful of gold and silver coins, presumably the property of murder victims, but on questioning members of the tribe, through intermediaries, received admissions for responsibility for the killings but no expression of regret. Discovery of the money led Tom Clarke, of the Encounter Bay Fisheries, to organise a search for the £4,000 in gold rumored to be on board the Maria. There were rumours of much wealth being recovered but, according to Simpson Newland, Clarke and Penney got nothing.

In November 1840 Penney and his friend Barton? Hack had an audience with Governor Gawler, from whom he received an appointment as physician to the Aboriginal people of the River Murray and Encounter Bay. He established a clinic at the 'Elbow' of the Murray, (now Goolwa), and struggled valiantly to win their confidence and respect, with some success if his own reports are to be believed. In a letter to the Governor Gawler's private secretary he explained how the Lower Murray tribes (Arongolingena, Toora, and Sekinyra) came to Encounter Bay for the fishing season, then on returning to their tribal lands were generally followed by Encounter Bay people, leading to territorial disputes.

The Milmenrura, or Big Murray tribe, who had tasted White Man's retributive justice following the Maria killings, were keen for revenge on the Whites and on the Encounter Bay mob, who had allied themselves with the settlers. Bloody raids and reprisals between the two groups were frequent, and the Encounter Bay mob begged for muskets with which to defend themselves, but were refused.

Penney, with support from Charles Sturt, requested £20 with which to purchase a boat to aid him in combating the (European) diseases from Encounter Bay which were spreading among the Lower Murray tribes and Milmenrura. Penney hoped to make some headway with the warlike Milmenrura, and learn their dialect, which was distinct from that of the Adelaide and Lower Murray tribes.

Having purchased the boat, he engaged a native crew, and for six months cruised the inlets of Hindmarsh Island and along the shores of Lake Alexandrina and Lake Albert, and along The Coorong. He found numerous Aboriginal people in need of attention, many at Pullen's station at Polpolda, east of Hindmarsh Island. All the while, he was compiling his "native grammar and vocabulary", on the language and dialects of the people of the lower Murray. In June 1841 he gave a popular lectures at Solomon's Theatre, Adelaide, on the character, habits, and customs of the lower Murray and Encounter Bay people.

Governor Gawler was replaced by Governor George Grey, who immediately began implementing his policy of strict fiscal responsibility, of which one casualty was Penney's medical mission to the lower Murray. He would have liked to continue his work and offered, through Sturt, to accept a cut in salary, which was then £60 per annum. He also offered to implement a scheme for employing men from the Encounter Bay tribe, who he found to be excellent workers, but needed some consistency in remuneration, rather than the situation then obtaining, when a man might be generously remunerated for some trivial service one day then get practically nothing for a full day's effort the next. Penney had a remarkable relationship of trust and devotion to the Aboriginal people of Encounter Bay, which was reciprocated, though it was unlikely they were prepared to extend their loyalty to other Europeans. He proposed an alternative to Robert Gouger's idea of a "native police force" – that with his boat and trained crew, he could maintain the peace at "the elbow" at a fraction of the cost of troopers. On 8 July 1841 Grey wrote to Penney, declining his offer.

He then sought employment at the North-West Bend, where Edward John Eyre was the Resident Magistrate, citing his previous success with the Milmenura tribe in support of his application. He was confident of earning the respect and support of the Upper Murray tribes, who had recently shown considerable hostility to overlanders from New South Wales, and whose language he was keen to learn. He offered to work for rations and a small salary, as his personal resources were depleted, but Governor Grey was adamant.

On 15 April 1842 he asked to be sent to Port Lincoln, where Aboriginal unrest had resulted in several murders, one being Rolles Biddle, an old friend, but was rebuffed on the grounds that the area already had a Protector of Aborigines, and reproached him for wanting to displace the incumbent.

Penney took on the job of editor for George Dehane's newspaper The Examiner from 12 August 1842, then resigned in June 1843, possible over the insertion (by Dehane?) of an article "Nonmus the Bolter" against his wishes, but he was struggling against ill health. The Examiner ceased publication with the issue of 24 June 1843.

Dr James Benjamin Harvey of Port Lincoln died on 26 February 1943 and Penney was appointed District Surgeon at Port Lincoln, with the attendant duties of landing waiter and postmaster, in his place, and where he died from consumption (tuberculosis) a year later.

== Poetry ==
He wrote a celebrated poem "The Spirit of the Murray", "replete with poetic sentiment, and pictorial delineation of the manners and traditions of the aboriginal tribes." Penney's early death was regretted as "genius scarce lighted up, when extinguished for ever"

== Family ==
No evidence has been found of a marriage or children.

J. Kemp Penney (c. 1832 – 5 May 1896) labour agent and frequent contributor to the press, was a brother.
