= Cape Jaffa, South Australia =

Cape Jaffa
- Town
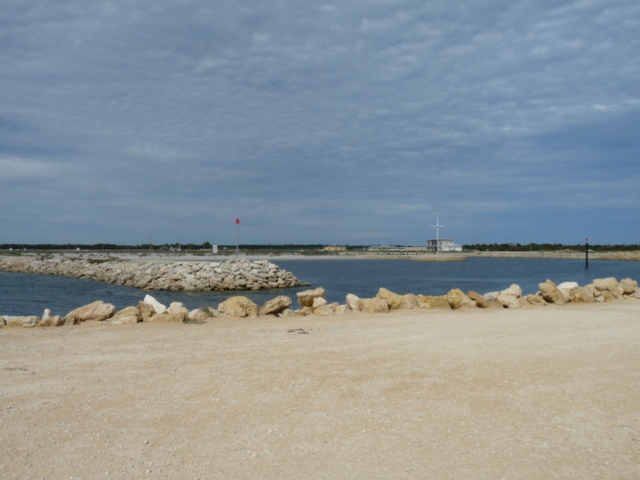
- New marina at Cape Jaffa, South Australia, 2010

- Coordinates: 36°57′18″S 139°40′19″E
- Country: Australia
- State: South Australia
- LGA: Kingston District Council
- Location: 245 km (152 mi) from Adelaide; 19 km (12 mi) from Kingston SE
- Established: 3 December 1998

Government
  - State electorate: MacKillop
  - Federal division: Barker

Population
  - Total: 54 (2016 census)
- Time zone: UTC+9:30 (ACST)
  - Summer (DST): UTC+10:30 (ACST)
- Postcode: 5275
- Mean max temp: 19.3 °C (66.7 °F)
- Mean min temp: 10.3 °C (50.5 °F)
- Annual rainfall: 489.4 mm (19.27 in)
Localities around Cape Jaffa
Ocean	Lacepede Bay	Wangolina
Ocean	Cape Jaffa	Wangolina
Ocean	Ocean	Wangolina
- Locations; Adjoining Localities

Cape Jaffa is a locality in the Australian state of South Australia located on the headland of Cape Jaffa on the state's south east coastline overlooking the body of water known in Australia as the Southern Ocean and by international authorities as the Great Australian Bight. It located about 245 kilometres (152 miles) south south-east of the state capital of Adelaide and about 19 kilometres (12 miles) south west of the town centre of Kingston SE.

The locality includes a settlement located on the north side of the headland overlooking Lacepede Bay which is also known as Cape Jaffa. The settlement includes a jetty and a marina. The locality includes part of the Bernouilli Conservation Reserve. The Marina (known as Cape Jaffa Anchorage) received development approval in January 2006. The plans allow for several stages of development. At least the first stage exists, and the marina is considered to still be "under construction" in 2018.

The 2016 Australian census which was conducted in August 2016 reports that Cape Jaffa had a population of 54 people.

Cape Jaffa is located within the federal division of Barker, the state MacKillop and the local government area of the Kingston District Council.

== Climate ==
Climate data for Cape Jaffa, elevation 17 m (56 ft), (1991–2020 normals, extremes 1991–present)
Month	Jan	Feb	Mar	Apr	May	Jun	Jul	Aug	Sep	Oct	Nov	Dec	Year
Record high °C (°F)	41.8 (107.2)	40.8 (105.4)	38.4 (101.1)	33.1 (91.6)	27.2 (81.0)	22.4 (72.3)	19.5 (67.1)	23.3 (73.9)	27.6 (81.7)	34.0 (93.2)	38.4 (101.1)	40.3 (104.5)	41.8 (107.2)
Mean daily maximum °C (°F)	24.7 (76.5)	24.4 (75.9)	22.7 (72.9)	20.0 (68.0)	16.9 (62.4)	14.7 (58.5)	14.0 (57.2)	14.6 (58.3)	16.2 (61.2)	18.7 (65.7)	21.5 (70.7)	22.9 (73.2)	19.3 (66.7)
Mean daily minimum °C (°F)	13.7 (56.7)	13.7 (56.7)	12.5 (54.5)	10.8 (51.4)	9.5 (49.1)	7.9 (46.2)	7.6 (45.7)	7.8 (46.0)	8.5 (47.3)	9.2 (48.6)	10.9 (51.6)	12.4 (54.3)	10.4 (50.7)
Record low °C (°F)	6.5 (43.7)	6.3 (43.3)	5.2 (41.4)	1.3 (34.3)	0.7 (33.3)	−0.7 (30.7)	0.1 (32.2)	0.2 (32.4)	1.0 (33.8)	2.2 (36.0)	3.4 (38.1)	4.7 (40.5)	−0.7 (30.7)
Average precipitation mm (inches)	18.0 (0.71)	17.2 (0.68)	21.7 (0.85)	31.8 (1.25)	56.3 (2.22)	65.7 (2.59)	81.3 (3.20)	70.9 (2.79)	48.9 (1.93)	31.9 (1.26)	26.2 (1.03)	23.2 (0.91)	493.1 (19.42)
Average precipitation days (≥ 0.2 mm)	5.7	4.9	8.4	12.3	17.2	18.5	20.5	21.0	16.8	12.3	8.6	8.3	154.5
Average afternoon relative humidity (%)	55	57	58	62	71	76	77	74	72	63	58	55	65
Source: Australian Bureau of Meteorology (precipitation 1994–2020 humidity 1991–2010)

== Gallery ==
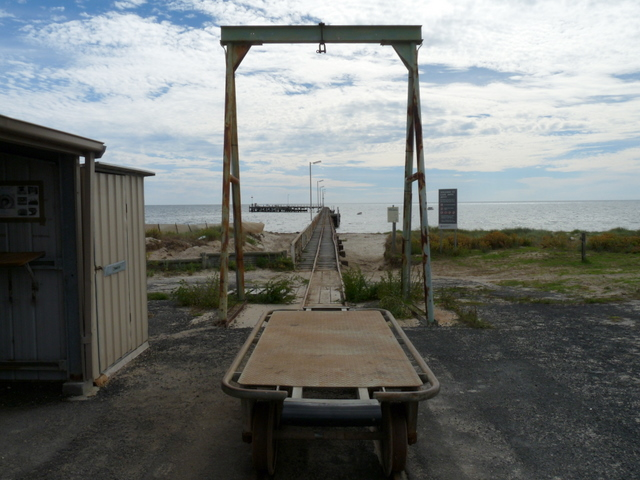
The Cape Jaffa jetty, 2010

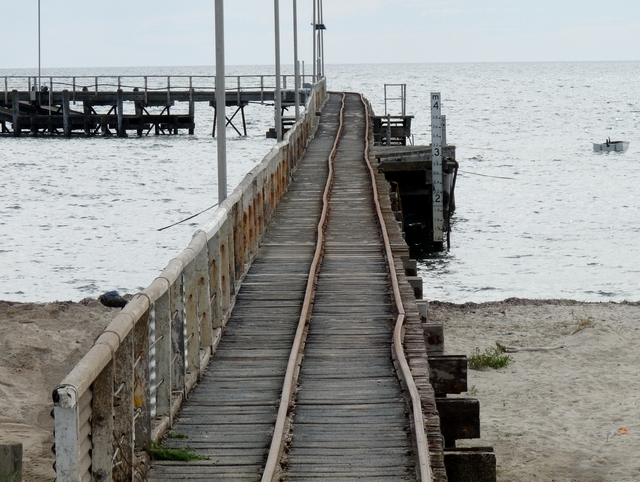
The Cape Jaffa jetty, 2010

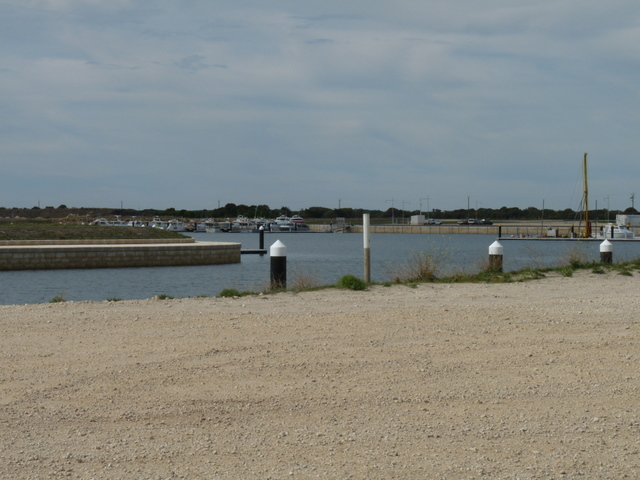
New marina at Cape Jaffa, 2010
