= Matthew Moorhouse =

English colonial in Australia, perpetrator of the Rufus River massacre (1813–1876)

Matthew Moorhouse, c.1870

Matthew Moorhouse (1813 – 29 March 1876) was an English pioneer in Australia, pastoralist, politician, and Protector of Aborigines in South Australia. He was in charge of the armed party that murdered 30-40 Maraura people, which may have included women and children, now known as the Rufus River massacre.

== Early life and arrival in Australia ==
Moorhouse studied medicine and obtained the degree of M.R.C.S. in 1836. He was practising medicine in Hanley, Staffordshire, when the Crown appointed him Protector of Aborigines in South Australia from 20 June 1839, a position he held until 1856.

He arrived in South Australia in June 1839, along with the Rev. Ridgway William Newland, on Sir Charles Forbes.

== Career ==
=== Piltawodli ===
As Protector, he lived at Piltawodli mission and camp for some years, working closely with the German missionaries, Christian Teichelmann and Clamor Schürmann (and later Samuel Klose), who learned and taught in the Kaurna language. There is only one remaining page of Moorhouse's diary, containing several Kaurna songlines not recorded elsewhere, but much information about the Kaurna people has been gleaned from his reports and official correspondence. In July 1845, the whole site, including the school, was dismantled on the orders of Governor George Grey, who thought it best to take the children away from their parents, and a new "Native School" run by the government, which taught only in English, was established near what is now Kintore Avenue, and designated "The Location". The Aboriginal students proved to be every bit as bright and teachable as their white contemporaries, but their number remained small and Moorhouse re-purposed the schoolhouse as temporary accommodation for the Irish orphan girls who arrived in June 1849. The Native School closed in 1851, and became the nucleus of the Destitute Asylum. The remaining children were taken to Poonindie Mission at Port Lincoln on the Eyre Peninsula).

=== Rufus River Massacre ===
In 1841, there was a dispute between European overlanders and the Mataura people, a sub–group of the Barkindji. The overlanders had been engaging in sexual relations with Barkindji women without giving the Barkindji the food and clothing that was promised in return. Moorhouse led a group of armed settlers to the Rufus River near Wentworth following a report that about 150 Barkindji warriors appeared to be readying to attack. The settlers opened fire on the Barkindji before they were within spear-throwing range, claiming at least 35 killed and 16 injured, though Aboriginal oral tradition suggests this is a conservative figure. Moorhouse's official account which was sent to the Governor of South Australia, George Grey claims that "the result was, to the natives, the death of nearly 30, about 10 wounded, and four (one adult male, one boy, and two females) taken prisoners". Most of the wounded would be expected to die from their wounds, because Aboriginal medicine was ill-equipped to deal with gunshot wounds. The report of Protector Moorhouse was largely supported by James Collins Hawker.

=== Parliamentary career ===
In January 1855 Moorhouse had the duties of comptroller of the Destitute Poor Establishment, and superintendent of the Female Immigrant Depot added to his responsibilities as Protector of Aborigines. He retired on 31 March 1856, and went to England, where he lectured on South Australia and promoted migration. He then visited North America, where he travelled extensively by railroad and investigated various systems of education.

== Later life ==
Moorhouse purchased shares in properties near Riverton and Saddleworth, but soon sold out and with Joseph Fisher and others bought 27,700 acres (11,200 ha) near the Hummocks. Moorhouse managed the station until Robert Barr Smith bought it in 1870.

Moorhouse died after a short illness on his station Bartagunyah near Melrose, South Australia on 29 March 1876, leaving a widow, two sons and a daughter.

== See also ==
- Kaurna
- List of massacres of Indigenous Australians
- Henry Inman (police commander)
- James Rigby Beevor
- Maria (brigantine)
- James Brown (Australian pastoralist)
