= Portaulun people =

Aboriginal Australian people

The Portaulun were an indigenous Australian people of South Australia. Portaulun language is a dialect of Ngarrindjeri language.

== Country ==
The Portaulun's territory was estimated by Norman Tindale to encompass roughly 300 square miles (780 km^{2}), along the western bank of the Murray River from Wood Hill to Wellington and Pomanda Point. Their westward extension ran to Grote Hill.

== Social organization ==
According to Tindale, the Portaulun were divided into clans, the names of two of which are known:

- Warawalde
- Welindjeri

The Welindjeri name is post-colonial, being formed on the introduced toponym of Wellington, and thus meaning 'belonging to the Wel'.

== History ==
Famous preacher and Aboriginal leader David Unaipon (or David Ngunaiponi) was a Portaulun man.

== Alternative names ==
- Putjin
- Pomunda or Poomunda(toponym, Pomunda Point)
- Wellington tribe

== Sources ==
- Brown, A. R. (July–December 1918). "Notes on the Social Organization of Australian Tribes". The Journal of the Royal Anthropological Institute of Great Britain and Ireland. 48: 222–253. doi:10.2307/2843422. JSTOR 2843422.
- Hawker, J. C. (1899). Early experiences in South Australia. Adelaide: E.S. Wigg & Son.
- Parkhouse, T. A. (April 1936). "Some words of the Australian autochthone". Mankind. 2 (1): 16–19–253. doi:10.1111/j.1835-9310.1936.tb00920.x.
- Taplin, George (1878) [First published 1873]. "The Narrinyeri" (PDF). The Native Tribes of South Australia. Adelaide: E.S. Wigg & Son. pp. 1–156.
- Tindale, Norman Barnett (1974). "Portaulun (SA)". Aboriginal Tribes of Australia: Their Terrain, Environmental Controls, Distribution, Limits, and Proper Names. Australian National University Press. ISBN 978-0-708-10741-6.
