= Ramindjeri =

Aboriginal Australian people

The Ramindjeri or Raminjeri people were an Aboriginal Australian people forming part of the Kukabrak grouping now otherwise known as the Ngarrindjeri people. They were the most westerly Ngarrindjeri, living in the area around Encounter Bay and Goolwa in southern South Australia, including Victor Harbor and Port Elliot and extending northwards along the eastern coast and coastal hinterland of Gulf St Vincent past Aldinga, Port Willunga, Red Ochre Cove, Port Noarlunga and the Onkaparinga River. The Ramindjeri People of Rapid Bay are also recorded as having ancestral fishing and camping rights along the southern Adelaide coastline of Glenelg, Brighton and Marino, and hunting rights that extended north along the Adelaide coast all the way to Lefevre Peninsula, and a closely associated Dreaming (Tjilbruke). In modern native title actions a similar extensive territory has been claimed.

== Country and naming ==
Ramindjeri Heritage Association Inc asserts historical territory including Karta (Kangaroo Island) and the whole southern portion of the Fleurieu Peninsula, extending as far north as Noarlunga or even the River Torrens. However, the claimed territory overlaps a significant portion of the territory claimed by both the neighbouring Ngarrindjeri to the east and the Kaurna to the west, in their Federal Court Native Title Claims Registered respectively in 1998 and 2000.

Linguistic evidence suggesting that the "Aborigines" encountered by Colonel Light at Rapid Bay in 1836 were Kaurna speakers is incorrect as authoritative eyewitness evidence and official records confirm that Rapid Bay was occupied by Ramindjeri people with tribal and family connections to Encounter Bay and not to Adelaide's Tandanye people. Assistant Surveyor Boyle Travers Finniss, later South Australia's first premier, lived with these people at Rapid Bay, and later recognised his friend, Rapid Bay man 'Peter' on the banks of the River Torrens within the City of Adelaide, leading the military defence of Ramindjeri territory and throwing back an invasion by the North men (Ngadjuri).

David Horton's map as hosted online by AIATSIS, based largely on Norman Tindale's work, shows Kaurna down the west side of the Fleurieu and Ngarrindjeri to the east of them. The Dreaming story of the Kaurna creator ancestor, Tjilbruke, extends as far west as Rosetta Head.

There is no evidence of continual occupation on Kangaroo Island earlier than the complete separation of the island from the mainland 11,000 years ago. Several small sites dated 6,000, 5,200 and 4,300 years BP have been found, but it is unknown whether these belong to visitors or a remnant population. As available technology precludes intentional visits by Aboriginal people, a remnant population of up to 200 individuals is the preferred hypothesis, with the last dying 2,500 years ago.

Ramindjeri, dubbed "Encounter Bay blacks", were observed holding a full moon ceremony at Onkaparinga by John Bull's 1837 water exploration party, guided by pre-1836 Sealer Nat Thomas.

Ronald and Catherine Berndt's ethnographic study, which was conducted in the 1930s, identified six Kukabrak, (Note: "The appropriate traditional categorization of the whole group was Kukabrak: this term, as we mention again below, was used by these people to differentiate themselves from neighbours whom they regarded as being socio-culturally and linguistically dissimilar. However, the term Narrinyeri has been used consistently in the literature and by Aborigines today who recognise a common descent from original inhabitants of this region-- even though their traditional identifying labels have been lost" (Berndt, Berndt & Stanton 1993, p. 19).) subsequently described as "Ngarrindjeri" clans, the Ramindjeri lakinyeri occupying the coast from Cape Jervis to a few kilometres south of Adelaide. Berndt posited that the Ramindjeri clans may have expanded along trade routes as the Kaurna were dispossessed by colonists.

Law professor Irene Watson wrote in a 2019 article about the Maria massacre: "The ancient identity and name of the Milmendjeri, one of the Tanganekald peoples, belong to the Coorong. They are ancient names that have become almost lost to living memory. Post-invasion, the peoples and territories of the Coorong have become known as Ngarrindjeri — this name is now privileged in native title claims over the lands and affairs of traditional First Nations nations such as Ramindjeri, Tanganekald, and Yaralde."

=== Native title ===
Ramindjeri lands have been subject to a native title claim lodged by Ngarrindjeri claimants in 1998. In 2009, Ramindjeri Heritage Association Inc spokesman Karno Walker challenged the legitimacy of that claim, claiming the Ramindjeri were the rightful owners of land encompassing much of both the 1998 Ngarrindjeri claim and the 2000 Kaurna claim, and calling the Kaurna and Ngarrindjeri "Johnny-come-latelys".

A native title claim was registered with the Federal Court in 2010, encompassing over 20,000 square kilometres (7,700 sq mi) of land extending to the River Torrens on the north, Kangaroo Island on the west, and the Murray Mouth on the east. Subsequently, Walker made unofficial claims to land as far north as Tea Tree Gully.

The claim was rejected by the National Native Title Tribunal on 24 March 2011, having failed six of the eleven required preconditions for acceptance, Walker later claimed that eight out of ten had been fulfilled. The Federal Court was set to hear the case in October 2011. The Federal Court published the findings of Mansfield in September 2014 that the application be dismissed.

The native title dispute led one local council to alter their "Acknowledgement of country" statement before meetings. The City of Unley changed their acknowledgement to read "Aboriginal people" instead of "Kaurna", so as not to take sides in the dispute.

== Language ==
The Ramindjeri language was a dialect of the Ngarrindjeri language, with a separate classification in the AUSTLANG database, but is now extinct.

== Alternative names ==
Raminjeri is an alternative spelling, while other variant names and spellings include: Rormear, Ramong, Raminyeri, Ramindjerar, and Ramingara. Ethnonyms used by other peoples include Paruru (meaning "uncircumcised" or "animal") and Wirramu-mejo, both used by Kaurna; and Tarbanawalun, used by the Jarildekald people, to the east of Lake Alexandrina and the River Murray.

== Social organisation ==
The Ramindjeri were composed of 14 clans.

Clan name	Totems	Location
(1) Ratalwerindjera	pangarii.(seal)	Goolwa to Middleton (Note: "name from the place Ratalwar. This is the western promontory near Middleton (Ratalang). Opposite this place is the important Keli (dog) Rock. Dog was a mythic man who was metamorphosed. A heavy tide from the Southern Ocean covers the Keli Rock with spray and causes the Dog to 'bark'. The sound warned Ratalwerindjera of an approaching storm." (Berndt, Berndt & Stanton 1993, p. 311))
(2) Latalindjera	kondili (whale)	Latang on the Hindmarsh River near Victor Harbor
(3) Muwerindjera	unknown	western bank of the Inman River.
(4) Ngarakerindjera	ngarakani(shark)	Ngarakerung near King's Point.
(5) Krilbalindjera	krilbali(brown skylark)	near Kondilinar (place of the whale)
(6) Limindjera	limi (stingray or carpet shark)	Hindmarsh River estuary
(7) Wati-erilindjera	wati-eri(jaybird)	Near Mount Hayfield
(8) Lepuldalindjera	lepuldali(marsupial possum)	Mt Robinson
(9) Yaltalindjera	yoldi, yalti(cormorant)	Bald Hills, Inman Valley
(10)Pariwarindjera	tjirbuki (species of crane)	Cape Jervis(Pariwa)
(11)Yangkalyarindjera	kalaipani (butterfish),tinemari (bream)	Yankalilla to Yankie Hill, and the Normanville coast
(12) Meiperinyera	unknown	Myponga
(13)Ruwurindjera	uwal, kuratji(tommy rough fish)	Ruwuru south of Port Willunga
(14)Tainbarindjera	mulgali (red ochre)	Tainbarung, Noarlunga River

== Culture ==
The Ramindjeri had a genre of tuŋari songs, called mantimanŋari, which were songs of caution, composed to warn or teach lessons to members of the tribe, such as one mocking a recently bereaved woman for appearing to be too much in a hurry to remarry.

== History of contact ==
Ramindjeri were amongst, if not the first South Australian Aboriginal people to come into regular contact with Europeans since 1802, with Karta (Kangaroo Island) based sealers raiding Ramindjeri ruwe (territorial lands) for women. In the early 19th century, pre-1836 settlement.

Ramindjeri men began working as whalers around Encounter Bay in the 1830s.

== Victoria Square proposal ==
After the Adelaide City Council released a master plan for a A$100 million redevelopment for Victoria Square in 2010, Karno Walker, with architect Michael Thiele and community development consultants Encompass Technology, proposed a Ramindjeri-themed redevelopment at a projected cost of A$500 million. They claimed it could be funded by private developers in return for parking revenue from a 2000-space underground carpark.

== Sources ==
- Amery, Rob (2016). Warraparna Kaurna!: Reclaiming an Australian language. University of Adelaide Press. ISBN 978-1-925-26125-7.
- Bachmayer, Lisa (1 September 2010). "Unley tangled in native title dispute". Eastern Courier Messenger.
- Berndt, Ronald Murray; Berndt, Catherine Helen; Stanton, John E. (1993). A World that was: The Yaraldi of the Murray River and the Lakes, South Australia. UBC Press. ISBN 978-0-774-80478-3.
- Brown, A. R. (July–December 1918). "Notes on the Social Organization of Australian Tribes". The Journal of the Royal Anthropological Institute of Great Britain and Ireland. 48: 222–253. doi:10.2307/2843422. JSTOR 2843422.
- Charrison, Emily (15 July 2010). "Ramindjeri v Kaurna on Vic Sq". City Messenger.
- Greenwood, Rob (1 March 2011). "Gully faces native title claim". Leader Messenger.
- Jenkin, Graham (1979). Conquest of the Ngarrindjeri. Rigby. ISBN 978-0-727-01112-1.
- Malone, Gavin Damien Francis (2012). "Chapter 10: Kaurna Ancestor Being Tjilbruke: Commemorations". Phases of Aboriginal Inclusion in the Public Space in Adelaide, South Australia, since Colonisation (PhD thesis). Flinders University. p. 217.Also available as <https://flex.flinders.edu.au/file/ae876628-4508-4c12-a442-ad22e8e56fdb/1/Thesis-Malone-2012-11Chapter10.pdf>.
- "Map of Indigenous Australia". AIATSIS.
- Martin, Sarah (8 April 2011). "Ramindjeri people claim Adelaide under native title". The Advertiser. Adelaide.
- Monroe, M. H. (30 September 2011). "Karta: Island of the Dead - Kangaroo Island Australia".
- "Native title bid pursued in Federal Court". Australian Broadcasting Commission. 8 April 2011.
- "Native Title Determination Application: Ramindjeri" (PDF). National Native Title Tribunal. 22 October 2010.
- "Ngunderi". South Australian Museum. Archived from the original on 30 September 2009.
- "An old time episode. The murder of Captain Barker, narrative of a survivor". The Advertiser. Adelaide. 30 October 1894. p. 6 – via Trove.
- "Ramindjeri (SA)". South Australian Museum.
- "Registration test decision" (PDF). National Native Title Tribunal. 24 March 2011.
- Taylor, Rebe (2002). Unearthed: The Aboriginal Tasmanians of Kangaroo Island. Wakefield Press. ISBN 978-1-862-54552-6.
- Tindale, Norman Barnett (1935). "Legend of Waijungari, Jaralde tribe, Lake Alexandrina, South Australia, and the phonetic system employed in its transcription". Records of the South Australian Museum. 5 (3): 261–274 – via BHL.
- Tindale, Norman Barnett (1974). "Ramindjeri (SA)". Aboriginal Tribes of Australia: Their Terrain, Environmental Controls, Distribution, Limits, and Proper Names. Australian National University Press. ISBN 978-0-708-10741-6.
- Walker v State of South Australia [2014] FCA 962 (5 September 2014), Federal Court (Australia)
- "Walker v State of South Australia [2014] FCA 962". Australian Institute of Aboriginal and Torres Strait Islander Studies. Archived from the original on 29 March 2020.
- Wheatley, Kim (20 November 2009). "Tribal war on native title". The Advertiser. Adelaide.
