= Warki =

Aboriginal Australian people

The Warki are a tribe of the Ngarrindjeri Australian Aboriginal people of southern Australia.

== Language ==
The Warki spoke a dialect variety of Ngarrindjeri.

== Country ==
The Warki traditionally inhabited the area around the north and western areas of Lake Alexandrina, from Grote Hill as far as Currency Creek. Norman Tindale estimated their lands at 300 square miles (780 km^{2}). They were also present on the eastern and western extremities of Hindmarsh Island.

== Social organization ==
The Warki were composed of at least 8 clans:

- Korowalle

== Alternative names ==
- Warkend
- Wakend
- Koraulun (Jarildekald exonym for the Korowalle clan)
- Milang dialect

== Sources ==
- Brown, A. R. (July–December 1918). "Notes on the Social Organization of Australian Tribes". The Journal of the Royal Anthropological Institute of Great Britain and Ireland. 48: 222–253. doi:10.2307/2843422. JSTOR 2843422.
- Taplin, George (1879). The Folklore, Manners, Customs, and Languages of the South Australian Aborigines (PDF). Adelaide: Government Printer.
- Tindale, Norman Barnett (1974). "Warki (SA)". Aboriginal Tribes of Australia: Their Terrain, Environmental Controls, Distribution, Limits, and Proper Names. Australian National University Press. ISBN 978-0-708-10741-6.
