= Tiparra Reef =

Tiparra Reef South Australia
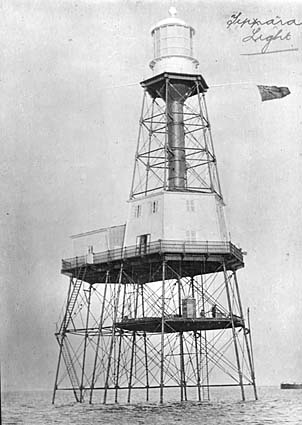
- Tipara Reef Screw Pile

- Coordinates: 34°04′17″S 137°23′30″E
- Location: 14 km (9 mi) west of Port Hughes

Tiparra Reef (also spell as Tipara) is a reef located in Spencer Gulf in South Australia about 14 kilometres (8.7 miles) west of the town of Port Hughes.

The reef is described as being "a bank of sand, 2.5 nautical miles (4.6 kilometres; 2.9 miles) in extent, with depths of less than 5 metres (16 feet), that lies in the middle of Tiparra Bay" with a"limestone ledge, 0.1 nautical miles (0.19 kilometres; 0.12 miles) long in a N[orth] S[outh] direction and about 20 metres (66 feet) wide, that just dries, lies on the S[outh] W[est] end of the reef 5 nautical miles (9.3 kilometres; 5.8 miles) N[orth] W[est] of Cape Elizabeth" (which is the southern headland of Tiparra Bay).

The limestone ledge was the site of an operational lighthouse from August 1877 until 1995 when its service was largely replaced by a light tower located on Warburto Point about 14 kilometres (8.7 miles) to the north-east. Much of the lighthouse structure remains in place along with a minor navigation aid consisting of a flashing light.
