= Cartridge paper =

Type of high-quality heavy paper

Cartridge paper is a type of high-quality heavy paper used for illustration and drawing. The term "cartridge" refers to the history of the paper originally being used for making paper cartridges for early muzzleloading firearms.

== See also ==
- Paper board
