= Cape Jaffa =

Cape Jaffa Cape Jaffa, South Australia
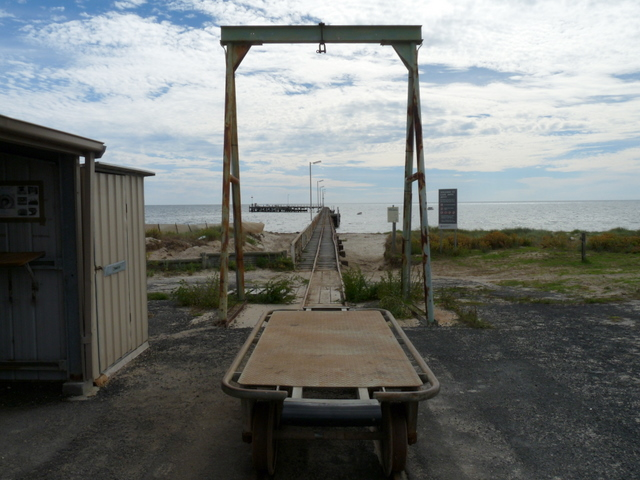
- The Cape Jaffa jetty and a trolley that runs on the railway line, used for moving seafood from the boats to the coldstores behind the jetty

- Coordinates: 36°57′21″S 139°40′13″E
- Population: 66 (SAL 2021)
- Location: 20 km (12 mi) south west of Kingston SE

Cape Jaffa is a headland in the Australian state of South Australia located at the south end of Lacepede Bay on the state's south east coast about 20 kilometres (12 miles) south west of the town centre of Kingston SE. The cape is described as being "a low sandy point" with "its sea face is about One nautical mile (1.9 km) long" and having a "wooded range rises near the S[outh] part of the cape and reaches a height of 77 metres (253 feet) at Mount Benson, about 8.5 nautical miles (15.7 kilometres) S[outh] E[ast]". A settlement known as King's Camp in some sources and as Cape Jaffa in other sources is located about 0.5 nautical miles (0.93 kilometres) to the north west of the cape. This settlement includes a jetty fitted with a navigation aid and a marina. The southern coastline of the cape forms part of the Bernouilli Conservation Reserve.

== See also ==
- Cape Jaffa Lighthouse
