= Ngarrindjeri language =

Australian Aboriginal language

Ngarrindjeri
- Native to: Australia
- Region: South Australia
- Ethnicity: Ngarrindjeri, Tanganekald, Ramindjeri, Yarilde, Meintangk, Portaulun, Warki
- Native speakers: 312 (2016 census)
- Language family: Pama–Nyungan: Lower Murray; Ngarrindjeri
- Dialects: Yaralde (Ngarrindjeri); Tangane (Tanganekald) †; Ramindjeri; Portaulun; Warki
- Signed forms: Jaralde Sign Language

Language codes
- ISO 639-3: nay
- Glottolog: narr1259
- AIATSIS: S69
- ELP: Ngarrindjeri

Ngarrindjeri, also written Narrinyeri, Ngarinyeri and other variants, is the language of the Ngarrindjeri and related peoples of southern South Australia. Five dialects have been distinguished by a 2002 study: Warki, Tanganekald, Ramindjeri, Portaulun and Yaraldi (or Yaralde Tingar).

Ngarrindjerri is Pama–Nyungan. McDonald (2002) distinguishes five dialects: Warki, Tanganekald, Ramindjeri, Portaulun and Yaraldi. Bowern (2011) lists the Yaraldi, Ngarrindjeri, and Ramindjeri varieties as separate languages.

Tanganekald, also known as Thangal, is now extinct.

== Name ==
Linguist Ghil'ad Zuckermann suggests that the original pronunciation of Ngarrindjeri had two distinct rhotic consonants: the first was rr (as in Italian) and the second was r (as in English). However, in revitalized Ngarrindjeri, both rhotics "are pronounced unlike English". Zuckermann analyses this phenomenon as over-applied, hypercorrect "emblematicity" due to Othering: the Ngarrindjeri revivalists are trying to define themselves vis-à-vis the "Other", distancing themselves from "the colonizers' mother tongue, Australian English" (even at the expense of losing one of their own original rhotics).

Other names include Jarildekald, Jaralde, Yarilde, Yarrildie, Jaraldi, Lakalinyeri, Warawalde, Yalawarre, Yarildewallin (although as mentioned above, Yaraldi is regarded as a dialect).

Berndt, Berndt & Stanton (1993) wrote: "The appropriate traditional categorisation of the whole group was Kukabrak: this term, as we mention again below, was used by these people to differentiate themselves from neighbours whom they regarded as being socio-culturally and linguistically dissimilar. However, the term Narrinyeri has been used consistently in the literature and by Aborigines today who recognise a common descent from original inhabitants of this region-- even though their traditional identifying labels have been lost."

== Status and revival ==
In 1864, the publication of the Ngarrindjerri Bible was the first time portions of the Bible were translated into an Aboriginal language. 8 Genesis 2:8 follows in Ngarrindjerri from the 1864 translation and a literal English translation. "Jehovah winmin gardenowe Edenald, kile yuppun ityan korn gardenungai." "Jehovah God planted a garden in Eden, toward the east, and there he put the man whom he had formed."

The last fluent speaker of Ngarrindjerri died in the 1960s, but there have been attempts to revive the language in the 21st century, including the release of a Ngarrindjeri dictionary in 2009. The work of Lutheran missionaries Christian Teichelmann and Clamor Schürmann in the early days of the colonisation of South Australia have contributed enormously to the revival of both Ngarrindjeri and Kaurna.

There were 312 speakers of Ngarrindjerri recorded in the 2016 Australian census.

A second edition of the dictionary was published in 2019, with 500 additional words, bringing the total to 4,200. Ngarrindjeri elder Phyllis Williams has been collaborating with linguist Mary-Anne Gale for many years, teaching the language to adults and developing resources to aid language revival.

The third, expanded edition of the dictionary, again compiled by Gale and Williams, was published by AIATSIS in 2020. Hundreds of new words have been added, including words for items which did not exist in the 19th century, such as "solar panel".

In 2021 the first students of the first training course to be specially tailored to the teaching of Aboriginal language, run by Tauondi Aboriginal College in Port Adelaide, graduated, and are now able to pass on their skills to the community. University of Adelaide linguist Robert Amery and his wife, Mary-Anne Gale, have helped to drive the project.

The musical group Deadly Nannas (Nragi Muthar) have been writing and singing songs in Ngarrindjerri and English, and using them to help teach the language in schools and other venues.

== Sign language ==
The Yaralde had the southernmost attested Australian Aboriginal sign language.

== Phonology ==
=== Consonants ===
	Peripheral		Laminal		Apical	
	Labial	Velar	Palatal	Dental	Alveolar	Retroflex
Plosive	p	k	c	t̪	t	ʈ
Nasal	m	ŋ	ɲ	n̪	n	ɳ
Lateral			ʎ	l̪	l	ɭ
Rhotic					r	ɽ
Approximant	w		j			

- /r/ can be heard as a tap and approximant, as allophones [ɾ, ɹ].

=== Vowels ===
	Front	Central	Back
High	i		u
Mid	e		o
Low		a	

Vowel	Allophones
/i/	[i], [ɪ], [ɨ]
/e/	[e], [ɛ], [æ]
/a/	[a], [ɐ], [ʌ], [ɑ]
/o/	[o], [ɔ], [ɒ]
/u/	[u], [ʊ], [ʉ]

- /i/ when preceding retroflex consonant, can be heard as central [ɨ]
- /u/ when occurring after a trill consonant in closed syllables can be heard as central [ʉ]
- A mid sound /ə/ can also be heard in various syllabic positions.

== Vocabulary ==
The following words are from the Ngarrindjeri language:

- kondoli – 'whale'
- korni/korne – 'man'
- kringkari, gringari – 'white man'
- muldarpi/mularpi – 'travelling spirit of sorcerers and strangers'
- yanun – 'speak, talk'

These are words for animals extinct since European colonisation:

- maikari – Eastern hare-wallaby
- rtulatji – Toolache wallaby
- wi:kwai – Pig-footed bandicoot
