= Maria massacre =

Brigantine wrecked off the coast of South Australia in 1840

Coordinates: 36.932015°S 139.584697°E

History

United Kingdom
- Name: Maria
- Builder: Grand Canal Docks, Dublin
- Launched: 1823
- Out of service: 28 June 1840
- Fate: Wrecked, Margaret Brock Reef, South Australia

General characteristics
- Type: Brigantine
- Tons burthen: 135, or 136 (bm)
- Length: 70.19 ft (21.4 m)
- Beam: 20.99 ft (6.4 m)
- Draught: 10.9 ft (3.3 m)
- Sail plan: Brigantine
- Armament: Single cannon
- Notes: Passenger ship

Maria was a brigantine of 136 tons, built in Dublin, Ireland, and launched in 1823 as a passenger ship.

On 26 June 1840 she sailed from Port Adelaide under orders for Hobart. Maria was commanded by William Ettrick Smith. With Smith sailed a mate, a crew of eight men and boys, and 16 passengers: four men, six women, five children, and a baby in arms. She wrecked on the Margaret Brock Reef, near Cape Jaffa in the colony of South Australia, somewhere south-west of the current site of the town of Kingston SE, South Australia, two days later. The wreck has never been located.

Aboriginal people on the Coorong murdered some or all of the survivors of the wreck as they journeyed to Adelaide, an event known as the Maria massacre. There were no eyewitness accounts of the killings, and accounts vary as to whether there were 25 or 26 victims; either way, it was the largest massacre of colonists by Aboriginal people in Australia. A punitive expedition, setting out from Adelaide and acting under instructions from Governor Gawler, detained the men believed to be responsible and summarily hanged two presumed culprits. This caused considerable controversy within Australia and back in Britain, as Aboriginal South Australians had been declared to be British subjects with colonisation of South Australia in 1836, and under this assumption were protected under British law.

== The ship ==
=== Background ===
Maria was launched from Grand Canal Docks, Dublin, in 1823. The data below are from Lloyd's Register (LR).

Year	Master	Owner	Voyage	Source & notes
1825	W.Lawson	J.Gray	Dublin–Barbados	LR
1830	J.Brooks; D.Levey	Martin	Liverpool–Gibraltar	LR; repairs in 1827 and 1828
1833	McCormack	Foster & Co	London–Gambia	LR; large repairs 1832

Maria no longer appears in LR in 1834 or subsequently.

=== Final voyage ===
Maria left Hobart Town, Van Diemen's Land, on 24 May 1840 and arrived at Port Adelaide harbour on Sunday 7 June 1840, under Captain W. Smith, carrying three passengers and a large amount of cargo, mostly food.

Maria left Port Adelaide on 26 June 1840 for Hobart Town, with 25 persons on board, including the captain, William Ettrick Smith, and his wife. Passengers included Samuel Denham and Mrs Denham (née Muller) and their five children (Thomas, Andrew, Walter, Fanny, and Anna); the recently widowed Mrs York (sister of Samuel Denham), and her infant; James Strutt (previously with Lonsdale's Livery Stables, hired as Mrs Denham's servant); George Young Green and Mrs Green - possibly James Greenshields; (Note: A book was found near the body with James Greenshields 1839 written in pencil inside) Thomas Daniel and Mrs Daniel; and Mr. Murray. The ship's mate and crew were John Tegg, John Griffiths, John Deggan/Durgan/Dengan, James Biggins, John Cowley, Thomas Rea, George Leigh/Lee, and James Parsons.

On 28 June 1840, Maria foundered on the Margaret Brock Reef, (Note: Named later, after the 1852 shipwreck of the barque Margaret Brock) which lies west of Cape Jaffa on the south-east coast of South Australia.

=== The wreck ===
Maria's hull was never found, though pieces of wreckage washed ashore at Lacepede Bay. In 1972 a diver recovered a rubber gudgeon which may have come from either the Maria or the Margaret Brock. There have been rumours of gold sovereigns aboard the ship, but records have not confirmed this. There were stories of coins being passed around the Ngarrandjeri people, which may have been traded by survivors before the massacre. It was reported a few years after the wreck that Dr Richard Penney had found 11 gold sovereigns on the beach, and a whaler named Tom Clarke obtained more from the local Aboriginal people.

It is hoped that the wreck may one day be located, using advanced remote sensing technology. This would be of great historical value. Senior maritime heritage officer Amer Khan of the Department of Environment, Water and Natural Resources State Heritage Unit, said that such a discovery could help to reveal the chain of events which led up to the tragedy. Khan suspects the wreck lies somewhere near Cape Jaffa, where the treacherous Margaret Brock reef is located.

A cannon reported to have belonged to the Maria and which "was probably carried for the look of the thing or for signalling" was purchased from the Lee family of Middleton by D. H. Cudmore around 1914 as a garden feature for his home "Adare" in Victor Harbor, South Australia, then as a family tradition fired to welcome each New Year.

A bell, claimed to have belonged to the ship, was acquired by Nuriootpa High School in 1942.

== Massacre ==
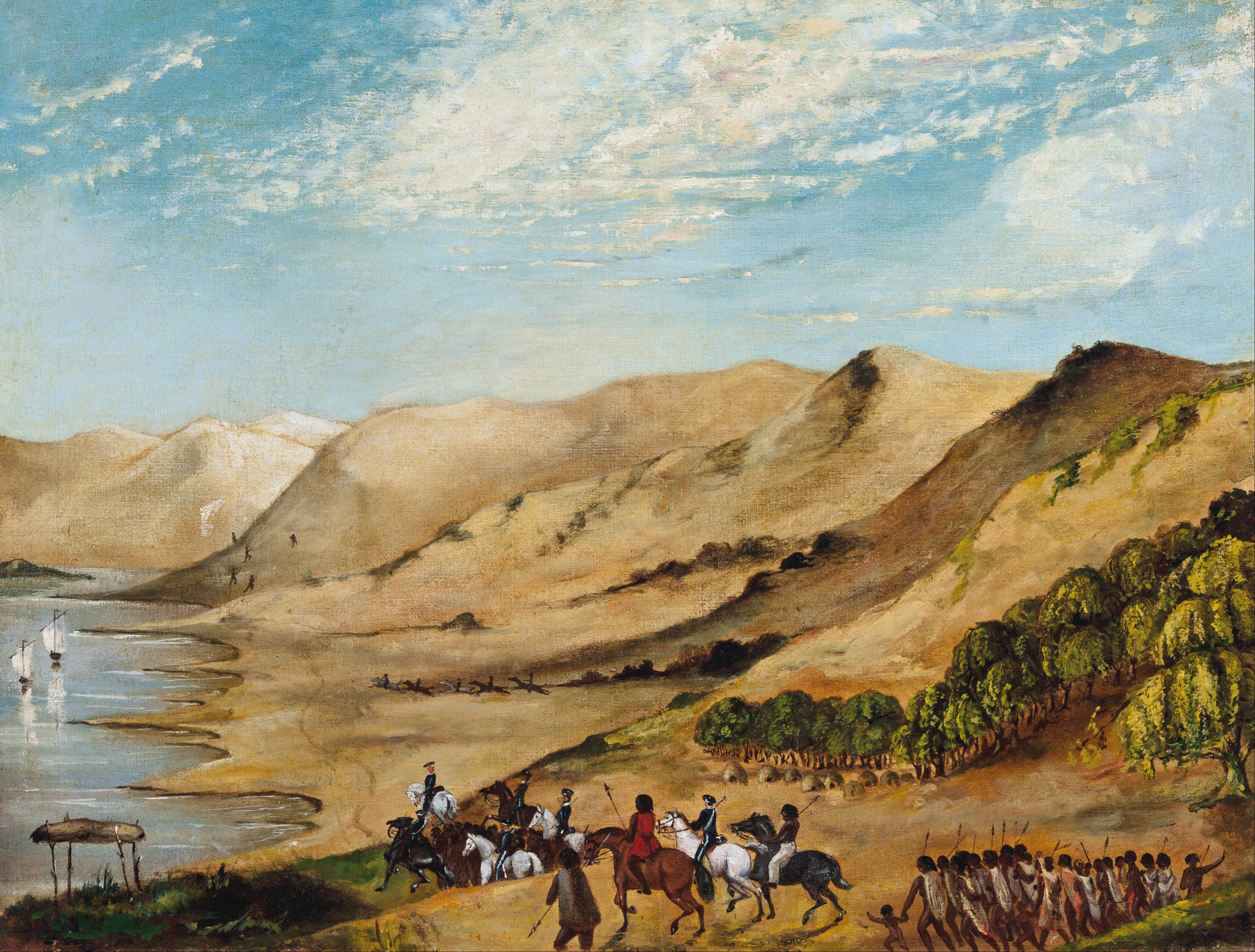
Major O'Halloran's expedition to the Coorong, August 1840

The passengers and crew safely reached land. There were no survivors to tell the tale, but accounts suggest that the passengers commenced trekking on the land side of the Coorong coast towards the lakes (Alexandrina and Albert), with the sailors heading inland at some point.

According to a later account, around 60 kilometres (37 mi) from the wreck, in company with some friendly Aboriginal people, they came across a track and at once had a dispute as to whether or not to follow it, and decided to split up: Captain Smith and the crew took to the track and most of the passengers continued along the shoreline. Two days later some of this latter group split from the party in the hope of rejoining the captain. Around this time they were attacked and killed by a group of the Milmenrura (or "Big Murray Tribe", now known as Tanganekald, also known as Tenkinyra), (Note: Names of Aboriginal groups are as reported in the contemporary press. Assumed to have been tribes or clans of the Ngarrindjeri people but may have no connection with any later group. The group here written as "Milmenrura" has elsewhere been described as the Milmendjuri clan of the Tanganekald tribe. Irene Watson, Pro Vice Chancellor: Aboriginal Leadership and Strategy, David Unaipon Chair, and Professor of Law at UniSA, wrote in a 2019 article about the massacres: "The ancient identity and name of the Milmendjeri, one of the Tanganekald peoples, belong to the Coorong. They are ancient names that have become almost lost to living memory. Post-invasion, the peoples and territories of the Coorong have become known as Ngarrindjeri — this name is now privileged in native title claims over the lands and affairs of traditional First Nations nations such as Ramindjeri, Tanganekald, and Yaralde.") stripped of their possessions, clubbed to death, decapitated and buried in the sand or stuffed into wombat burrows.

After word of the murders of multiple white people by "natives" reached Adelaide in late July, a group headed by William Pullen, with Dr Richard Penney, five sailors, one police trooper, and three Aboriginal interpreters, set out to investigate on 28 July. On 30 July they reached a massacre site, where they found body parts strewn around, comprising the naked bodies of two men, three women, a 10-year-old-girl, two boys (around 15 and 10 years old), and a baby girl. All had facial bruising. The party buried the bodies and recovered two wedding rings from the women's fingers. The group reported finding "legs, arms and parts of bodies partially covered with sand and strewn in all directions", and a trail of footprints leading from the area. On 1 August, they encountered a group of Aboriginal people in possession of blankets and clothing, with one wearing a sailor's jacket, and were told about the deaths of two further survivors. Pullen questioned the group who had led him to the bodies; many remained silent, but Pullen described two of the men as "the most villainous (sic) looking characters I ever saw", and assumed their guilt. Pullen's group returned to Adelaide with the rings, which were identified as belonging to Mrs York and Mrs Denham.

Such detail of how the Maria survivors came to be widely separated into three groups can only be supposition, as none lived to tell the tale. The body of the captain was found far removed from the others, and no trace of the crew members was ever found, so it is not known whether they suffered the same fate as the passengers. One contemporary noted that survivors of the schooner Fanny (Capt. James Gill), wrecked in the same area two years earlier (21 June 1838), were given every assistance by, presumably, men from the same tribe. Aboriginal people reported that the survivors of the shipwreck were guided down the Coorong as far as a point opposite Lake Albert, where they were persuaded to separate before all being murdered.

It was also alleged that after the hanging, police killed a larger group of Milmenrura people.

== Retribution ==
After reading Pullen's report, Governor Gawler commissioned Major O'Halloran to investigate further and his party left Adelaide on 15 August 1840. Reinforcements were called for and on 22 August, O'Halloran left Goolwa (then known as "the Elbow") with a mounted troop, including Alexander Tolmer, Captain Henry Nixon, Charles Bonney, and Pullen. The party consisted of 12 police, 11 sailors and three Aboriginal people from Encounter Bay. Gawler's instructions were "...when to your conviction you have identified any number, not exceeding three, of the actual murderers...you will there explain to the blacks the nature of your conduct... and you will deliberately and formally cause sentence of death to be executed by shooting or hanging". They followed the coast, while boats sailed parallel. On 23 August the force ran into a number of Aboriginal people and rounded up 13 men, two boys, and 50 women and children, a total of 65. O'Halloran shackled the men and set the others free, though they remained nearby voluntarily. In the course of rounding them up, three Aboriginal men were killed, while an unrecorded number were wounded when attempting to flee. Maria's log-book was recovered in one of their wurleys, as were numerous articles of clothing, some blood-stained, and other incriminating evidence, including some silver spoons. On 24 August, Two Aboriginal men who were identified as being complicit in the killings tried to escape by swimming and were shot and wounded (or "shot down").

In his report, O'Halloran stated that his captives yielded up the man who had killed a whaler named Roach some two years previously, and also pointed out the location where one of the Maria murderers could be found. Two of the natives then volunteered to collect the man and, according to O'Halloran's report, all the natives shouted with joy when the man appeared. O'Halloran pronounced a death sentence on him.

It was judged by the party that there was sufficient evidence of guilt, and the men unanimously pronounced a guilty verdict against them. O'Halloran summarily sentenced two Aboriginal men, Mongarawata and Pilgarie (or Moorcangua?), to death. A gallows was built from sheoak and the men were hanged immediately, at 3.00pm on 25 August, with their bodies left to hang and rot near the graves.

In the main, the account given by the Aboriginal people of the massacre was similar to what the colonists reported, with a couple of discrepancies:

- The report says that four people were executed (two shot and two hanged), the Aboriginal account reporting six.
- The report states that 26 shipwreck survivors were killed, while Aboriginal people said that 25 were killed, as one woman managed to escape across the mouth of the Murray.

Either way, it was and remains the largest massacre of colonists by Aboriginal people in Australia.

Later, it was reported that there had been a legend among the Lower Murray tribes about "a white woman with red hair living her life with the blacks".

== Aftermath ==
Bodies were recovered over the following six months, as follows, found at four sites (a total of 18):

- A grave containing eight bodies (assumed Mr & Mrs Denham, James Strutt, Mrs York, four Denham children)
- A man and a woman in a wombat hole
- A man found in a wombat hole
- A young teenage boy, in a wombat hole (possibly a Denham child)
- An upper torso of a man in a wombat hole
- A woman in a wombat hole
- Three male and one female body under a large rock

In addition, according to Irene Watson (2019) "the number of First Nations Peoples' lives lost to the punitive mission remains unknown. Our Aboriginal oral history maintains that it was many"; this had not been acknowledged by the time of writing.

O'Halloran was not exceeding his brief; he was following his instructions from Governor Gawler, whose instructions were:

"...when to your conviction you have identified any number, not exceeding three, of the actual murderers...you will there explain to the blacks the nature of your conduct ...and you will deliberately and formally cause sentence of death to be executed by shooting or hanging".

On 12 August, Gawler had consulted Judge Charles Cooper of the Supreme Court as to whether the Aboriginal people were subject to British law, to which he replied that British law could not apply to "people of a wild and savage tribe whose country, although within the limits of the Province of South Australia, has never been occupied by Settlers, who have never submitted themselves to our dominion, and between whom and the Colonists, there has been no social intercourse". He also wrote:

My objection to try the natives of the Big Murray tribe is founded, not on any supposed defect of right on their part, but on my want of jurisdiction. It is founded on the opinion that such only of the native population as have of some degree acquiesced in our dominion can be considered subject of our laws, and that with regard to all others, we must be considered as much strangers as Governor Hindmarsh and the first settlers were to the whole native population when they raised the British standard, on their landing at Glenelg.

Watson (2019) points out, in her discussion on the impact of colonisation on Aboriginal peoples, "the lack of acknowledgement that there had never been a dialogue between us and the British on the question of our legal and political status. At no stage had Aboriginal Peoples been informed of our coming to being as 'British subjects', let alone consented to it".

Gawler later said that he had been proceeding on the principles of martial law, although martial law had not been publicly announced, on the advice of and unanimous agreement of the Executive Council, owing to concerns about the public perception of such an announcement. The Council preferred to treat the Milmenrura people as "an openly hostile tribe and foreign enemy".

In a sketchbook by the then Surveyor General of South Australia, Edward Charles Frome, there is a sketch of a Milmenrura village in the south-east consisting of a cluster of about twelve established homes. It is annotated with the note "burnt by me, October 1840".

== Response to the executions ==
In Australia, little blame was apportioned to O'Halloran for his part in this affair; not so for Governor Gawler, who was severely criticised by sections of the press, notably the Register. Newspapers in Van Diemen's Land also condemned Gawler.

The Aborigines' Protection Society roundly condemned Gawler's actions. The Society also questioned the legality of the actions; the Chief Justice, though, was of the opinion that South Australian law could not be applied, because the tribe had not pledged allegiance to the Crown. The controversy may have played a part in Gawler's recall some months later.

There was much debate about the legality or otherwise of the executions. Justice Cooper had tried to justify the summary punishment by saying that the Milmenrura people were a hostile nation and not British subjects. The Register attacked this stance, providing long arguments to show that both positions were untenable.

In London, the Colonial Office was of the opinion that both Gawler and O'Halloran were liable to be tried for murder because the law stated that Australian natives were considered British subjects and protected under the same laws as the British colonists. In October 1841, the Secretary of State for the Colonies replied to Gawler's report, in which he attempted to justify his policy in the matter. The opinion of the Law Officers of the Crown was that the accused could have been brought to trial in the usual way, so their summary execution was an act of murder. The Commissioner of Police and all present were guilty as principals, and the Governor an accessory before the fact. The only way they could be indemnified was by an Act of Parliament or by a pardon under the Great Seal. They later opined that no action should be taken until a prosecution or similar might warrant it. No further action was taken, and the inquiry lapsed.

On the subject of leaving the hanged men in full view of the community until their bodies rotted, anthropologist Diane Bell wrote "Given the strict rules about the handling of the dead and the fears of sorcery associated with the fat collected from the corpse being 'smoked' on a platform erected for the dead, this colonial object lesson angered the Ngarrindjeri then, and does still now". She also quotes other experts who noted that this incident, along with others, formed a turning point in their interactions with white people, or kringkari: "violation of sacred places and of women incurred serious punishment".

== Commemoration and legacy ==
Maria Creek in Kingston was named as a reminder of the wreck.

A monument comprising a 2-metre (6 ft 7 in) high blue-grey Karataphyre quartz rock and a plaque, commemorating the wreck of Maria was unveiled at Kingston SE on 18 February 1966 by the National Trust of South Australia, with the inscription:

The brigantine "Maria" bound from Port Adelaide to Hobart was wrecked on Margaret Brock Reef in June 1840.

Erected by the National Trust of South Australia

In memory of the survivors who landed near this spot and set out to walk to the nearest settlement at Encounter Bay.

All were murdered by the Milmendjuri Clan of the Tanganekald Tribe of Aborigines near Lakes Albert and Alexandrina.

They were :-

- Captain William E. Smith and his Wife.
- Passengers Mr & Mrs Samuel Denham and family of five.
- Mrs York and infant daughter.
- James Strutt.
- Mr & Mrs George Greenshield.
- Mr & Mrs. Thomas Daniel.
- Mr. A. Murray and nine members of the crew.

The two natives who instigated the massacre were executed by a Police party at Pilgari near the scene of the mass murder.

Unveiled by Hurtle Morphett Esq. M.C., President of the National Trust of South Australia,

18th February 1966

In December 2024 it was announced that the Electorate of Frome, a state electoral constituency, would be renamed Ngadjuri before the 2026 SA election, owing to Frome's involvement in burning the village. The name was chosen to honour the Ngadjuri people, the First Nations people of Mid North.

== Differing accounts ==
Since nobody from the Maria survived it is difficult to ascertain what exactly happened. On 10 April 1841, members of the Tenkinyra tribe guided Richard Penny to a spot where they promised the remains of a drowned white man were buried. He believed it would be Captain Collet Barker, who was speared to death in the same area on 30 April 1831. They found instead the bodies of four of the five from Maria still unaccounted for; one drowned and four bashed to death. The Aboriginal people told Penny that the attack had followed the shipwrecked party's refusal to hand over clothing that they had considered their just entitlement for guiding and sustaining the group and carrying the children across their land. The Maria party had promised plenty of blankets and clothing from Adelaide after they returned, but the Aboriginal people started to help themselves to the goods and a fight ensued, ending in the killing of the shipwrecked party.

One researcher, Graham Jaunay, reported: "The passengers and crew managed to launch a boat and it would seem that all arrived safely on shore. They were befriended by members of the local tribe, the Milmenrura, who apparently negotiated to take them east along the coast towards Encounter Bay - the nearest settlement. While accounts vary, when the party reached the territorial boundary at Little Dick Point, the aborigines would go no further. The wreck survivors argued that they had negotiated to be taken all the way to Adelaide. Despite the protestations, an exchange took place and the so-called Needles Tribe took over escort duties. It would seem that the refugees' clothes were coveted by some men of the clan although contemporary reports have never made it clear which clan. The difficulties were seemingly compounded by some individual crewmen attempting to entice sexual favours from some aboriginal women without realising that this placed certain traditional obligations on them".

In 2003 Ngarrindjeri elder Tom Trevorrow said that the story of the Maria was well known among his elders, and that he was told the survivors had met up with their people. According to Trevorrow, the Ngarrindjeri group offered them "fire, water and food...It was the duty of male people to help these people. But every time they'd come to a boundary line, they had to hand them over to the next lakayinyeri (family group) — the Milmendura". He was told that the crew members had tried "to sexually interfere with them". The Ngarrindjeri people warned the sailors that this was not their way, and that their tribal law would punish such behaviour by death. At some point after this, a violent fight broke out, and the survivors of Maria were all killed. According to Trevorrow: "Even back then, if a Ngarrindjeri man interfered with a young Ngarrindjeri girl before marriage, if that person was given a warning, told 'Don't do that' [and] that person kept doing it, they'd be severely punished, meaning death" – and this is what led to the fight and killings.

"Telling the Whole Story" is a collaborative project being undertaken between First Nations of the South East and the Kingston SE branch of the National Trust of South Australia, led by law professor Irene Watson, who is of Tanganekald, Meintangk, and Bungandidj heritage. The project, supported by Kingston District Council, is an attempt to provide information that tells the story of the Maria massacre from an Indigenous perspective, involving provision of new interpretative signs and a sculpture alongside the present monument. Watson says that the story is more complex and multifaceted than that recorded in colonial sources "as fierce natives spearing and murdering white people surviving a shipwreck". Historian Amanda Nettelbeck devoted a chapter in Fatal Collisions (2001) entitled "Reconstructing the Maria Massacre" to the event, which includes several early accounts. She reports Dr Kenny's suggestion that the survivors were killed after being helped to safety and not receiving an expected reward, and anthropologist Norman Tindale's recording of Ngarrindjeri oral history given in 1934, which reported that some sailors "took a favourable opportunity of interfering with some native women". Another story passed down the generations said that after responsibility for the shipwreck survivors had been passed to a third clan (the Milmenrura) from the original one, some young men had got into an argument and killed them. These men had paid for their crime with their lives, punished by tribal elders; the men hanged by O'Halloran were therefore not guilty of the massacre.

== See also ==
- List of shipwrecks of Australia
- Rufus River massacre
