= Tanganekald people =

Aboriginal people of South Australia

The Tanganekald people were or are an Aboriginal Australian people of South Australia, today classed as part of the Ngarrindjeri nation.

The clan name Milmenrura (also spelt Milmendura, Milmendjuri, or Milmendjeri) was often used in the early days of the colony of South Australia to mean the whole tribe, in particular in association with the Maria massacre, in which 25 or 26 shipwrecked survivors of the brig Maria were massacred by local people on the Coorong.

== Country ==
The Tanganekald lay to the southeast of the Jarildekald (aka Yaralde) and occupied 750 square miles (1,900 km^{2}), predominantly about the narrow coastal strip along Coorong. Norman Tindale gives the following precise locations, based on detailed work with his informant, Clarence Long (Milerum), the last full blooded adult survivor of the Tangane.

from Middleton south to Twelve Mile Point (north of Kingston); inland only to about inner margin of first inland swamp and dune terrace, the Woakwine or 25 foot (7.5 m.) terrace, usually no more than 5 to 10 miles (8 to 16 km.); on islands in Lake Alexandrina, except eastern and western extremities of Hindmarsh Island; around Meningie at south and of Lake Albert, at Salt Creek and Taratap (Ten Mile Point).

Law professor Irene Watson wrote in a 2019 article about the Maria massacre: "The ancient identity and name of the Milmendjeri, one of the Tanganekald peoples, belong to the Coorong. They are ancient names that have become almost lost to living memory. Post-invasion, the peoples and territories of the Coorong have become known as Ngarrindjeri — this name is now privileged in native title claims over the lands and affairs of traditional First Nations nations such as Ramindjeri, Tanganekald, and Yaralde."

A distinction was made between (a) teŋgi - the sandy grassed limestone slopes just back of the pandalapi (Coorong lagoon) where they fished and favoured for camping, as was the southern seaward side, the pariŋari, protected by the natunijuru, duned sandhills between them and the seashore (jurli) - and the inland mallee and swamps, known as lerami, which were good for hunting.

The introduction of intensive pastoral practices, with sheep and cattle livestock, and rabbits, wrought havoc on the traditional Tanganekald landscape, leading one aged informant to grieve that,

'Our maldawuli (ancestors) told us, long, long ago, to 'beware of ants'. Whitemen must be the 'ants' he spoke of, for he has eaten away all my people, my herbs, my game, and even my sandhills.'

== Language ==
Tanganekald language, also known as Thangal, is one of several dialects of the Ngarrindjeri language, but is now extinct.

== Social organisation ==
According to Norman Tindale, the Tanganekeld people consisted of some 22 bands.

- Kondoliorn (lit. "whale men", composed of kondoli (whale) and -the suffix -orn (a contraction of korn meaning 'man, person')

The Tanganekald were divided into the following clans:

Clan name	Totems
Timpuruminďerar	maluwi, (a large fish), ťili (blue fly)
Kargarďerar	yalŋarinďeriorn, (bull ant) )?) kanmera, (mullet)
Kaikalabinďerar	
Kanmerarorn/Kanmerinďerar	
Mantändar	
Ŋaiyinďerar	
Puruwinďerar	
Momakenďerar	
Neŋkandular	
Milminďerar	

== Culture ==
Tindale recorded and transcribed many Tanganekald songs from Milerum, several of them bawdy. One story cycle describes legends associated with the people the Tanganekald regarded as having lived in their land before their arrival. These people, the Thakuni, inhabited the lagoons around the Robe district's limestone coastal area. They could render themselves invisible at will, and were the object of particular horror for their piercing eyes, which could, at a mere glance, kill a person. They could only be observed by making swift slanting gazes. These people were said to have finally driven out of their habitats by the ancestral forefathers of the tribe, who managed to drive them into the sea. There they were transmogrified either into jagged limestone boulders on the outer reefs, or became fairy penguins.

=== Mythology ===
According to Tanganekald belief, ancestral human-like beings, the Ŋurunderi and others, collectively referred to by the term maldawuli, were responsible, together with ŋaitje, (totemtotemic animals, consisting mostly of birds) for the creation of the landscape they now inhabit. One story in this sequence, whose events are associated with a crater near McGrath Flat homestead, concerns an aged woman, Prupe, (Note: The word reflects a term, brupe, registered by Meyer in his Ramindjeri wordlist in 1837, as meaning 'bad, old, imperfect', and, according to Tindale, 'ugly'. (Tindale 1938, pp. 19–20)) and her sister Koromarange, both of the Marntandi clan. Growing sightless, Prupe had turned cannibal and had eaten almost all of the district's children, save one, her sister's granddaughter Koakaŋgi. To save her grandchild and stave off Prupe's intrusive foraging for her, Koromarange would bring her sister food. This only made the latter suspicious and, as she went blind, she thought of taking the child to harvest her eyes so she might regain her sight. While the grandmother was netting fish, Prupe managed to kidnap her young ward, who had revealed her presence by crying out for water, and took her back to her camp. When Koromarange realized what had happened, she followed their spoors and came across Prupe, who was about to extract Koakaŋgi's eyes. Feigning fatigue she asked her sister to fetch her some restorative water, giving her a pierced skull as a water-dish, causing Prupe to lose time ladling in the water, while Koromarange contrived a snare nearby, and fled with the child. On discovering the deception, Prupe rushed forth, only to be trapped in the snare, and, kicking some live coals as she lashed out, was incinerated. The intensity of the fire caused a crater to be formed on the spot where she camped. Thus, Koromarange and her grandchild Koakaŋgi managed to get back to their beach camp.

== Alternative names ==
According to Tindale, various names were applied to this group:Tindale 1974

- Dangani
- Kalde (means language)
- Milmenrura (a clan name only; often used in early days for the whole tribe, presumably owing to the notoriety associated with their murder of survivors of the shipwrecked Maria), with the following versions: Milmendura, Milmendjuri (also spelt Milmendjeri), Milmain-jericon
- T(h)unga, Thungah
- Tangalun
- Tangane (short form), Tanganalun, Tanganarin, Tangani
- Tenggi (Potaruwutj term, actually name of the Coorong itself)
- Tenkinyra
- Wattatonga (name applied by the Bunganditj, lit. "men of the evening", because they live to the west)

== Notable people ==
Notable people of Tanganekald heritage include:

- Irene Watson, Pro Vice Chancellor: Aboriginal Leadership and Strategy, David Unaipon Chair, and Professor of Law at UniSA
