= James Unaipon =

Australian indigenous preacher (c. 1835–1907)

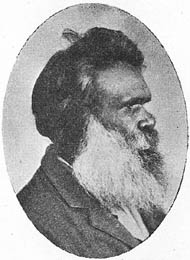
James Ngunaitponi in 1885

James Unaipon, born James Ngunaitponi, (c. 1835 – 1907) was an Australian Indigenous preacher of the Warrawaldie (also spelt Waruwaldi) Lakalinyeri of the Ngarrindjeri.

Born James Ngunaitponi, he took the name James Reid in honour of the Scottish Free Church minister who baptised him. As James Reid he was sponsored by the Aborigines' Friends' Association for training as a missionary at the Point McLeay Mission on the banks of Lake Alexandrina in the Coorong region of South Australia in 1865. After arriving at Point McLeay from his home in Wellington, Unaipon returned to using his birth name of Ngunaitponi however, the Europeans anglicised his name to Unaipon in correspondence.

On 27 July 1866 Unaipon married Nymbulda, the daughter of Pullum (King Peter) who was the Rupelle (Note: The various clans of the Ngarrindjeri are led by elders who also represent their clans in the Ngarrindjeri Tendi (council or government). The Rupelle is the elder chosen to preside over the Tendi only and has no personal authority over the Ngarrindjeri.) (misinterpreted as "King" by colonists) of the Ramindjeri. The Rev George Taplin assumed that the position of Rupelle was hereditary and widely promoted Nymbulda as a queen, believing that a missionary related to royalty would be more influential in converting the Ngarrindjeri. The Rupelle was in fact elected by the Indigenous Tendi (government) and conferred no additional status to his family. (Note: The only source for the name Nymbulda is George Taplin. The Yaraldi genealogy compiled by Ronald Berndt names her as Nymberindjeri with Nymbulda being her father's first wife and there was also another of that name married to another relative. It can not be ruled out that she was known by both names.)

Unaipon co-authored writings on the Ngarrindjeri language was the first Aboriginal deacon, and the father of renowned Australian inventor, David Unaipon.

== Sources ==
- Berndt, Ronald M.; Berndt, Catherine H.; Stanton, John E. (1993). A world that was: the Yaraldi of the Murray River and the lakes, South Australia. University of British Columbia Press. pp. 515–516. ISBN 0-7748-0478-5 – via Internet Archive.
- "David and James Unaipon – Ngarrindjeri Educators". The Unaipon School, UniSA. Archived from the original on 6 May 2006.
- Gale, M (1997). Dhanum Djorra'wuy Dhawu. Underdale: Aboriginal Research Institute. p. 71. ISBN 0-86803-182-8.
- Jenkin, Graham (1979). Conquest of the Ngarrindjeri. Rigby. pp. 142–148. ISBN 0-7270-1112-X.
- "Unaipon, James (c. 1835 – 1907)". Australian Dictionary of Biography Online Edition.
