= Ngarrindjeri Flag =

The Ngarrindjeri Flag represents the Ngarrindjeri people who populated and are the traditional owner of land on the southern coast of the Fleurieu Peninsula, the entire Coorong, Lake Alexandrina and lower Murray River before the British colonisation of South Australia.

== Background ==
The flag was designed in 1999 by Matt Rigney, a Ngarrindjeri person, and it was first flown and raised on 21 November 1999 near the Hindmarsh Island Bridge, which four years prior was the subject of controversy and culminated in a controversial royal commission. Over 300 Ngarrindjeri people and supporters were present when it was raised.

== Design ==
The blue on the flag represents the waters of the Ngarrindjeri nation, and the 18 dots represent the 18 Laklinyeris or tribes that form the Ngarrindjeri nation.

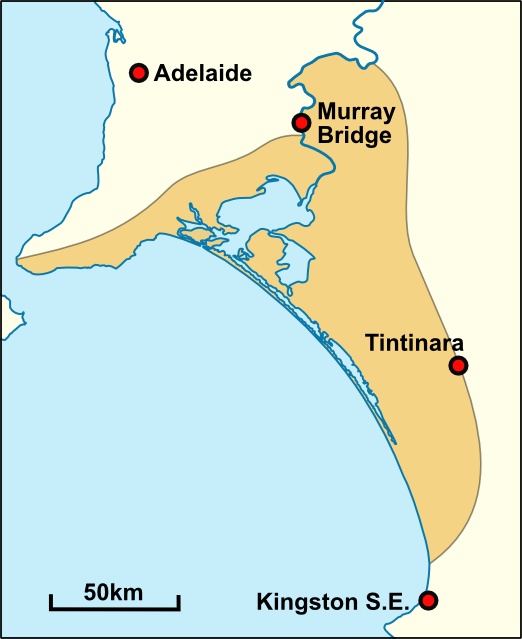
Ngarrindjeri Land

The sun is represented as the giver of life, the boomerang is called a sacred boomerang that when thrown the leaders of different Laklinyeris would meet in a Tendi to make and interpret the local Ngarrindjeri law.

The red represents mother nature, and the two spears are traditional fishing spears.

Colours of the flag
	Yellow	Red	Blue	White
RGB	248, 224, 44	220, 40, 12	26, 28, 93	255, 255, 255
