= Unaipon =

Unaipon is a surname. Notable people with the surname include:

- David Unaipon (1872–1967), Australian preacher, inventor, and author
- James Unaipon (c. 1835–1907), Australian preacher
