= Ngarrindjeri =

Australian Aboriginal group

Ngarrindjeri flag

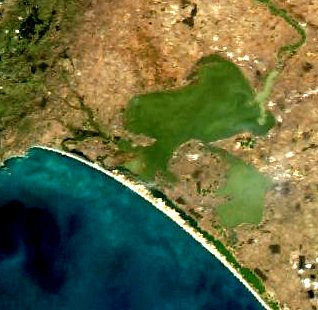
Ngarrindjeri culture is centred around the lower lakes of the Murray River.

The Ngarrindjeri people are the traditional Aboriginal Australian people of the lower Murray River, eastern Fleurieu Peninsula, and the Coorong of the southern-central area of the state of South Australia. The term Ngarrindjeri means "belonging to men", and refers to a "tribal constellation". The Ngarrindjeri actually comprised several distinct if closely related tribal groups, including the Jarildekald, Tanganekald, Meintangk and Ramindjeri, who began to form a unified cultural bloc after remnants of each separate community congregated at Raukkan, South Australia (formerly Point McLeay Mission).

A descendant of these peoples, Irene Watson, has argued that the notion of Ngarrindjeri identity is a cultural construct imposed by settler colonialists, who bundled together and conflated a variety of distinct Aboriginal cultural and kinship groups into one homogenised pattern, now known as Ngarrindjeri.

== Historical designation and usage ==
Sources disagree as to who the Ngarrindjeri were. The missionary George Taplin chose the term, spelling it as Narrinyeri, as a generic ethnonym to designate a unified constellation of several distinct tribes, and bearing the meaning of "belonging to people", as opposed to kringgari (whites). Etymologically, it is thought to be an abbreviation of kornarinyeri ("belonging to men/human beings", formed narr (linguistically plain or intelligible) and inyeri, a suffix indicating belongingness. It implied that those outside the group were not quite human. Other terms were available, for example, Kukabrak, (Note: The Berndts identified the Kukabrak as dwelling in the Lower Murray, Lakes and coastal areas (Berndt, Berndt & Stanton 1993, p. 22)) but Taplin's authority popularised the other term.

Later ethnographers and anthropologists have disagreed with Taplin's construction of the tribal federation of 18 lakinyeri (clans). Ian D. Clark has called it a "reinvention of tradition". Norman Tindale and Ronald Murray Berndt in particular were critical both of Taplin and of each other's reevaluation of the evidence. According to Tindale, a close evaluation of his material suggests that his data pertains basically to the Jarildekald/Yaralde culture, and he limited their borders to Cape Jervis, whereas Berndt and his wife Catherine Berndt argued that the Ramindjeri component lived in proximity to Adelaide. The Berndts argued that, despite cultural links, there was no political unity to warrant the "nation" or "confederacy".

== Country ==
According to David Horton's map "Aboriginal Australia", the Ngarrindjeri lands lie along the Coorong coastline, from Victor Harbor on the southern Fleurieu Peninsula in the north, to Cape Jaffa in the south. According to the map, the lands extend inland just north of Murray Bridge, receding to a 15-to-20 km (9.3-to-12.4 mi) wide coastal strip west of the Murray River lower lakes, but extending further inland in the south to a point near the state border at Coonawarra. The lands include both of the Murray lower lakes, Lake Alexandrina and Lake Albert.

== History ==
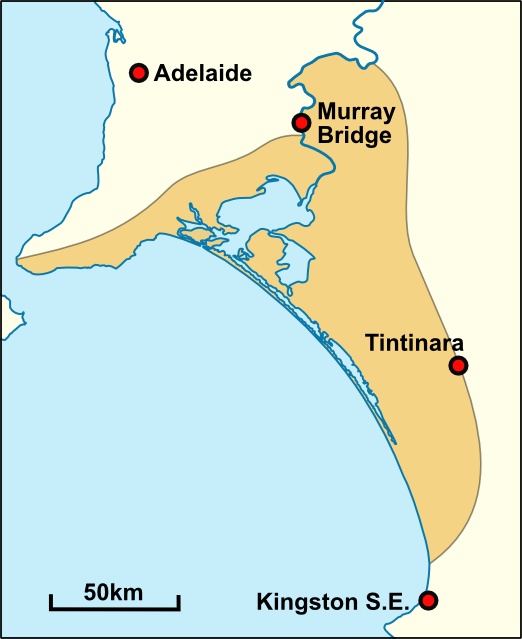
Approximate historical extent of Ngarrindjeri Country

=== Pre-contact history ===
Archaeology, particularly in excavations conducted at Roonka Flat, which affords one of the most outstanding sites for investigating "pre–European contact Aboriginal burial populations in Australia", has revealed that the traditional territory of the Ngarrindjeri has been inhabited since the Holocene period, beginning around 8,000 BCE down to around 1840 CE.

=== History after contact ===
Whalers and sealers had been visiting the South Australian coast since 1802 and by 1819 there was a permanent camp on Karta, Kangaroo Island. Many of these men were escaped convicts, sealers, and whalers who had brought Tasmanian Aboriginal women with them but they also raided the mainland for women, particularly Ramindjeri. Originally the most heavily populated area in Australia, a smallpox epidemic had travelled down the River Murray before colonisation by Britain, possibly killing a majority of the Ngarrindjeri. Funeral rites and cultural practices were disrupted, family groups merged and land use became altered. Songs from the time tell of the smallpox that came out of the Southern Cross in the east with a loud noise like a bright flash. In 1830 the first exploratory expedition reached the Ngarrindjeri lands and Charles Sturt noted that the people were already familiar with firearms.

Numbering only 6000 at the time of colonisation in 1836 due to the epidemic, they are the only Aboriginal cultural group in Australia whose land lay within 100 km (62 mi) of a capital city to have survived as a distinct people with a population still living on the former mission at Raukkan (formerly Point McLeay). Pomberuk (Ngarrindjeri for crossing place), on the banks of the Murray in Murray Bridge was the most significant Ngarrindjeri site. All 18 lakinyeri (tribes) would meet there for corroborees. Around 22 km (14 mi) further down the river was Tagalang (Tailem Bend), a traditional trading camp where lakinyeri would gather to trade ochre, weapons and clothing. In the 1900s, Tailem Bend was assigned as a government ration depot supplying the Ngarrindjeri.

=== European settlement ===
The Ngarrindjeri were the first South Australian Aboriginal people to work with Europeans in large-scale economic operations, working as farmers, whalers and labourers. As early as 1836 it was reliably reported that Aboriginal crews were working at the whaling station at Encounter Bay, and that some boats were worked by entirely Aboriginal crews, and the Ngarrindjeri were employed in the processing of whale oil in exchange for meat, gin and tobacco, and reportedly treated as equals.

George Taplin created the Raukkan mission on behalf of the Aborigines' Friends' Association (whose stated object was "the moral, spiritual, and physical well-being of the natives of this Province") in 1859. This established a settlement of the Ngarrindjeri people of the Coorong region at the mission, with some escaping the frontier wars that had decimated their population. The land was small, (Note: Originally, the land was only 180 ha (440 acres), but it was expanded to 688 ha (1,700 acres) in 1872.) but the Ngarrindjeri people thrived for a generation by the use of commerce. They mastered a series of trades, such as saddlery, blacksmithing, carpentry, stonemasonry, and baking, and also established a fishing enterprise and a wool-washing plant. Many Aboriginal people became Christians during their settlement. They also survived by working seasonally in pastoral properties and received donations. The community eventually struggled to survive due the subdivision of pastoral properties for farms, which resulted in a shortage of seasonal work, and the refusal of the South Australian Government to acknowledge their ownership of the land and to raise the size of their reserve. In 1890, the wool-washing plant closed due a new irrigation scheme built on the upper Murray River, that reduced the river's downstream flow.

Following the colonisation of South Australia and the encroachment of Europeans into Ngarrindjeri lands, Pomberuk remained until the 1940s, the last traditional campsite with the remaining Aboriginal occupants forced to leave in 1943 by the new land owners, the Hume Pipe Company, and resettled by the local council and South Australian government.

After hearing that the Aboriginal settlement was to be cleared, Ronald and his wife Catherine Berndt, who were researching Aboriginal culture in the area, approached the last Chief Protector of Aborigines, William Penhall, and obtained a verbal promise that the clearance would not proceed as long as the senior Ngarrindjeri elder, 78-year-old Albert Karloan (Karloan Ponggi), was living. Shortly after the Berndts left to return to Sydney, Karloan was given an eviction order effective immediately. Adamant that only death would separate him from his land, Karloan travelled to Adelaide to seek help, but returned to his former home in Pomberuk on 2 February 1943. He died the following morning.

Now known as the Murray Bridge Railway Precinct and Hume Reserve, the Ngarrindjeri Regional Authority seeks the renaming of Hume Reserve to Karloan Ponggi Reserve (after Albert Karloan) in honour of the old people who fought to retain the old ways. They have presented a development and management plan to preserve and develop the site as a memorial and an educational aid to reconciliation.

=== Hindmarsh Island bridge controversy ===
The Ngarrindjeri achieved a great deal of publicity in the 1990s due to their opposition to the construction of a bridge from Goolwa to Hindmarsh Island, which resulted in a Royal Commission and a High Court case in 1996. The Royal Commission found that claims of "secret women's business" on the island had been fabricated. However, in a case brought by the developers seeking damages for their losses, Federal Court judge Mr John von Doussa took issue with the findings of the Royal Commission, and in rejecting the claims, stated that he found Doreen Kartinyeri to be a credible witness.

The evidence received by the Court on this topic is significantly different to that which was before the Royal Commission. Upon the evidence before this Court I am not satisfied that the restricted women's knowledge was fabricated or that it was not part of genuine Aboriginal tradition.

As a result of the Australia-wide 1995–2009 drought, water levels in Lakes Albert and Alexandrina dropped to the extent that traditional burial grounds, which had been under water, were then exposed.

== Language ==
The first linguistic study of Ngarrindjeri dialects was conducted by the Lutheran missionary H.A.E. Meyer in 1843. He collected 1750 words, mainly from the Ramindjeri dialect at Encounter Bay. Taplin gathered many more words from several dialects, including Yaraldi and Portawalun, from the people who congregated around the Point MacLeay mission (now Raukkan) on Lake Alexandrina, and his dictionary had 1668 English entries. Other linguistic data gleaned since has enabled the compilation of a modern Ngarrindjeri dictionary containing 3,700 items. It is now classified, together with Yaralde, as one of the five languages of the Lower Murray Areal group.

== Culture ==
=== The Dreaming ===
Many sites of Dreaming significance are located along the River Murray. Near the confluence of the Murray River with Lake Alexandrina is Murungun (Mason's Hill), home to a bunyip called Muldjewangk. An ancestral hero named Ngurunderi chased an enormous Murray cod named Pondi from a stream in central New South Wales. In fleeing, Pondi created the River Murray, and contiguous lagoons from its flailing tail. Kauwira (Mannum) is where Ngurunderi forced Pondi to turn sharply south. The straight section of river to Peindjalong (near Tailem Bend) resulted from Pondi fleeing in fear after being speared in the tail. The twin peaks, large permanent sandhills of Mount Misery on the eastern shore of Lake Alexandrina are known as Lalangenggul or Lalanganggel (two watercraft) and represent where Ngurunderi brought his rafts ashore to make camp. Ngurunderi cut up Pondi at Raukkan, throwing the pieces into the water, where each piece became a species of fish.

While an established Dreaming existed, the various family groups each had their own variations. For example, some said Ngurunderi created the fish on the coast, other family groups believe he created them where the river enters Lake Alexandrina and some said that it was where the fresh water meets the salt. They also shared some Dreaming stories with tribes in New South Wales and Victoria.

In the late 1980s, the Dreaming stories were collected and one related to a creation story involving Thukabi, a turtle. There was no mention of Thukabi in the anthropological record and this example was later used as evidence for the survival of Ngarrindjeri stories that were unknown to anthropologists in support of the secret women's business.

The bunyip appears in Ngarrindjeri dreaming as a water spirit called the Muldjewangk or Mulyawonk, which would get anyone who took more than their fair share of fish from the waterways, or take children if they got too close to the water. The stories conveyed practical messages to ensure long-term survival of the Ngarrindjeri, embodying care for country and its people.

=== Customs ===
The Ngarrindjeri have their own language group and, apart from groups living along the river, share no common words with neighbouring peoples. Their patrilineal culture and ritual practices were also distinct from that of the surrounding people which has been attributed by Aboriginal historian Graham Jenkin to their enmity with the Kaurna to the west, who practised circumcision (Note: The Kaurna called the Ngarrindjeri the Paruru. The word was Kaurna for both "un-circumcised" and "animal".) and monopolised red ochre, the Merkani (Ngarrindjeri for "enemy") to the east, who stole Ngarrindjeri women and were reputed to be cannibals and to the north the Ngadjuri who were believed to send mulapi ("clever men", sorcerers) and, although not sharing a border, the Nukunu, who were thought to be sorcerers, incestuous and prone to commit rape.

By way of contrast and due to a shared dreaming, the relationship between the Ngarrindjeri and the Walkandi-woni (the people of the warm north-east wind), their collective name for the various groups living along the River as far as Wentworth in New South Wales, was of significant mutual importance and the groups regularly met at Wellington, Tailem Bend, Murray Bridge, Mannum or Swan Reach to exchange songs and conduct ceremonies. In 1849 the Rev. George Taplin observed a mustering of 500 Ngarrindjeri warriors, and was told by another resident that as many as 800 had gathered seven years earlier.

Each of the eighteen lakinyeri had their own specific funeral customs; some smoke dried bodies before being placed in trees, on platforms, in rock shelters or buried depending on local custom. Some placed bodies in trees and collect the fallen bones for burial. Some removed the skull, which was then used for a drinking vessel. Some family groups peeled the skin from their dead to expose the pink flesh. The body was then called grinkari, a term that they used to refer to the Europeans in the first years of settlement.

=== Lifestyle ===
Differing from most Australian Aboriginal communities, the fertility of their land allowed the Ngarrindjeri and Merkani to live a semi-sedentary life, moving between permanent summer and winter camps. In fact, one of the major problems encountered by Europeans was the determination of the Ngarrindjeri to rebuild their camps on land claimed for grazing. Unlike the rest of Australia, the Letters Patent establishing the Province of South Australia of 1836, following the South Australia Act 1834 (or Foundation Act), which together enabled the province of South Australia to be established, acknowledged Aboriginal ownership and stated that no actions could be undertaken that would "affect the rights of any Aboriginal natives of the said province to the actual occupation and enjoyment in their own persons or in the persons of their descendants of any land therein now actually occupied or enjoyed by such natives". This effectively guaranteed the land rights of Aboriginal people under force of law; however, this was interpreted by the colonists as simply meaning Aboriginal peoples could not be dispossessed of sites they permanently occupied. In May 1839, the Protector of Aborigines William Wyatt announced publicly, "it appeared that the natives occupy no lands in the especial manner" described in the instructions. Bowing to the interests of prominent colonists and the Resident Commissioner who wanted to survey and sell the land without hindrance, Wyatt never recorded that sites were permanently occupied in his reports on Aboriginal culture and practices.

=== Crafts and tools ===
The bulrushes, reeds and sedges were used for basket-weaving or making rope, trees provided wood for spears, and stones were fashioned into tools. The Ngarrindjeri were widely known as "outstanding craftsmen" specialising in basketry, matting and nets with records indicating that nets of more than 100 metres (330 ft) long were used to catch emus. It was claimed by colonists that the nets they made for fishing were superior to those used by Europeans. The nets, made by chewing the roots of bulrush (Typha shuttleworthii) until only the fibre remained which was spun into threads by the women to be then woven into nets by the men, were "considered to be a sort of fortune to its owner".

== Nutrition ==
The people were sustained by the flora and fauna for food and bush medicine. Before colonisation, there were extensive swamps and woodlands on the Fleurieu Peninsula, which provided habitat and food sources for a range of birds, fish, and other animals, including snake-necked turtles, yabbies, rakali, ducks and black swans. Flora included the native orchid (leek orchid), guinea flower and swamp wattle (Wirilda).

The Ngarrindjeri were well known to Europeans for their cooking skills and the efficiency of their camp ovens, the remains of which can still be found throughout the River Murray area. Some species of fish, birds and other animals considered easily caught were reserved by law for the elderly and infirm, an indication of the abundance of food in Ngarrindjeri lands. In the early years of the colony, Ngarrindjeri would volunteer to catch fish for the "white fellow men".

A wide range of foods were subject to ngarambi (taboo) prohibitions. In regards to ngaitji (family group totems), eating them was not ngarambi but depended on the family groups' own attitude. Some family groups banned eating them, some could eat them only if they had been caught by members of another family group and some had no restrictions. Once dead the animal was no longer considered ngaitji which is Ngarrindjeri for "friend". A ngaitji was not actually sacred in the western sense but considered a "spiritual advisor" to the family group. Other foods were ngarambi but had no supernatural sanctions and these relied on attitudes to the species. Male dogs were friends of the Ngarrindjeri so were not eaten while female dogs were not eaten because they were "unclean". Snakes were not eaten because of the "feel of their skin". Some bird species considered to act cruelly to other animals were ngarambi and magpies were because they warned other birds to flee if any were killed. Some bird species were ngarambi because they were the spirits of people who had died. Birds became narambi during nesting season and the malleefowl was ngarambi because its eggs were considered more valuable for food although there were no penalties for violation. Foods with supernatural sanctions were limited to bats, white owls and certain foods that were ngarambi only to women or to pregnant women. A separate category of ngarambi was young boys going through initiation. They were themselves considered ngarambi and any food they caught or prepared was ngarambi to all women who were even forbidden to see or smell it. Violation, whether accidental or deliberate, resulted in physical punishments including spearings that applied not only to the woman but to her relatives. Taplin in 1862 noted that ngarambi prohibitions were regularly being broken by children due to European influence and in the 1930s Berndt recorded that most ngarambi had been forgotten and if known, ignored.

== Social organisation ==
According to Taplin, there were eighteen territorial clans or lakalinyeri that constituted the Ngarrindjeri "confederacy" or "nation", each of which was administered by about a dozen elders (tendi). Each clan's tendi in turn would convene to elect a rupulli, or chieftain of the entire Ngarrindjeri confederacy. Taplin construed this as a centrally administered, hierarchical government representing tribal estates (ruwe), and one which was delegated to administer eighteen independent territories.

=== Ngarrindjeri lakinyeri ===
Taplin's list of 18 lakinyeri (Note: Taplin's original list may be examined in Woods & Taplin 1879, p. 2) – each with its own nga:tji/ngaitji (Note: Taplin glosses the meaning of this term as "friend". (Taplin 1879, p. 35)) – was further clarified by Alfred William Howitt, drawing on information he obtained from Taplin, and listing 20. The following reproduces Howitt's version of that list with, where possible, the location and totem.

Clan name	Location	Native word / English meaning	Totem (ngaitji)
Ramindjeri.	Encounter Bay; (Note: Unaipon adds Cape Jervis (Unaipon 2001, p. 145))	rumaii (the west)	wirulde/tangari. wattle gum
Tanganarin.	Goolwa to the Coorong.	(where shall we go?)	manguritpuri. pelican or nori.
Kandarlindjeri.	West side of the Murray Mouth.	(whales)	kandarli whale
Lungundaram.	East side of Murray Mouth	(seaside men)	tyellityelli tern
Turarorn	Mundoo Island in Lake Alexandrina	coot men	turi/tettituri. coot
Pankindjeri (Note: Taplin wrote parkindjeri, corrected by Brown. (Brown 1918, p. 251))	Coorong east of Lake Albert	(deep water)	butterfish)
Kanmerarorn.	Coorong between the Pakindjeri and Ngrangatari	(mullet men)	kanmeri (mullet).
Kaikalabindjeri.	Southern/ eastern shores of Lake Albert	(watching)	(a) ngulgar-indjeri bull ant;(b) pingi, water-weed
Mungulindjeri	Eastern side of Lake Albert	(thick or muddy water)	wanyi chocolate sheldrake
Rangulindjeri.	Western shore of Lake Albert	(howling dog)	turiit-pani (dark-coloured dingo)
Karatinderi.	Eastern side of Lake Alexandrina around Point Malcolm	(signal smoke)	turiit-pani (light-coloured dingo)
Piltindjeri.	eastern side of Lake Alexandrina	(ants)	(a) maninki. (leeches); (b) pomeri, (cat-fish). (Note: Brown adds a third totem:(c) kalkalli. (lace-lizard). (Brown 1918, p. 251))
Talk-indyeri		((a(fulness) (b)Artemis sp.	(a)? leech/? catfish? (b) tiyawi lace lizard.
Wulloke		(wood sparrow)	?leech, ?catfish? lace lizard?
Karowalli	North of Lake Alexandrina	(gone over there)	wayi whipsnake
Punguratpula.	Western side of Lake Alexandrina around Milang	(place of bulrushes)	peldi. musk duck
Welindjeri.	Northern shore of Lake Alexandrina	(belonging to, or by, itself)	nakare black duck; ngumundi red belly black snake
Luthindjeri	River Murray	(belonging to the sun rising)	kungari black swan; ngeraki; kikinummi grey bellied black snake
Wunyakulde	River Murray	corruption of walkande (north)	nakkare black duck
Ngrangatari / Gurrungwari	Lacepede Bay;	(at the southeast/southwest)	waukawiye kangaroo rat

Every member of a lakinyeri is related by blood and it is forbidden to marry another member of the same lakinyeri. A couple also may not marry a member of another lakinyeri if they have a great-grandparent (or closer relation) in common.

Norman Tindale's research in the 1920s and Ronald and Catherine Berndt's ethnographic study, which was conducted in the 1930s, established only 10 lakinyerar. Tindale worked with Clarence Long (a Tangani man) while the Berndts worked with Albert Karloan (a Yaraldi man).

- Malganduwa – No references before Berndt. No family groups identified.
- Marunggulindjeri – No references before Berndt. Two family groups.
- Naberuwolin. – No references before Berndt. No family groups identified, may be related to Potawolin.
- Potawolin – Also spelt Porthaulun and Porta'ulan. David Unaipon said this was the language name and that the lakinyeri was called Waruwaldi. No family groups identified but recorded by Radcliffe-Brown (1918: 253)
- Ramindjeri. – Also spelt Raminyeri, Raminjeri, Raminderar or Raminjerar (ar = plural), also known as Ramong and Tarbana-walun. 27 family groups.
- Tangani. – Also spelt Tangane, Tanganarin, Tangalun and Tenggi. 19 family groups confirmed and eight recorded but not located. The Kanmerarorn and Pakindjeri lakinyeri named by Taplin are recorded as Tangani family group.
- Wakend. – Also spelt Warki, Warkend, also known as Korowalle, Korowalde and Koraulun. One family group.
- Walerumaldi. – Also spelt Waruwaldi (see Potawolin) Two family groups.
- Wonyakaldi. – Also spelt Wunyakulde and Wanakalde. One family groups.
- Yaraldi. – Also spelt Yaralde, Jaralde and Yarilde. 14 family groups. In the 1930s, the ruwe (land) of six of these family groups extended along the coast from Cape Jervis to a few kilometres south of Adelaide, land traditionally believed to be Kaurna. The Rev. George Taplin recorded in 1879 that the Ramindjeri occupied the southern section of the coast from Encounter Bay, some 100 km south of Adelaide, to Cape Jervis but made no mention of any more northerly Ngarrindjeri occupation. Berndt posits that Ngarrindjeri family groups may have expanded along trade routes as the Kaurna were dispossessed by colonists.

Some lakinyeri may have disappeared and others may have merged as a result of population decline following colonisation. Additionally, family groups within the lakinyerar would use the local dialect or their own family groups name for lakinyeri names, also leading to confusion. For example, Jaralde, Jaraldi, Jarildekald and Jarildikald were separate family groups names as were Ramindjari, Ramindjerar, Ramindjeri, Ramingara, Raminjeri, Raminyeri. Several of these are also used as names for the lakinyerar. Family groups could also change their lakinyeri, Berndt found that two Tangani family groups who lived close to a Yaraldi family group had picked up their dialect and were thus now considered to be Yaraldi.

== Ngarrindjeri Regional Authority ==
The Ngarrindjeri Regional Authority is the peak representative body of the Ngarrindjeri people. It is made up of representatives from 12 grassroots Ngarrindjeri organisations, plus four additional elected community members. Its purpose is to:

- Protect and advance the welfare of the Ngarrindjeri people
- Protect areas of special significance to the Ngarrindjeri people
- Improve the economic opportunities of the Ngarrindjeri people
- Facilitate social welfare programs benefitting aboriginal people
- Pursue native title over the traditional lands and waters of the Ngarrindjeri people
- Enter into agreements of contracts with third parties on behalf of the Ngarrindjeri people
- Manage land of cultural significance to the Ngarrindjeri people, and to hold any interest in such land as trustee or otherwise on their behalf
- Act as the trustee under any trust established for the benefit of the Ngarrindjeri people
- Protect the intellectual property rights of the Ngarrindjeri people

== Notable people ==
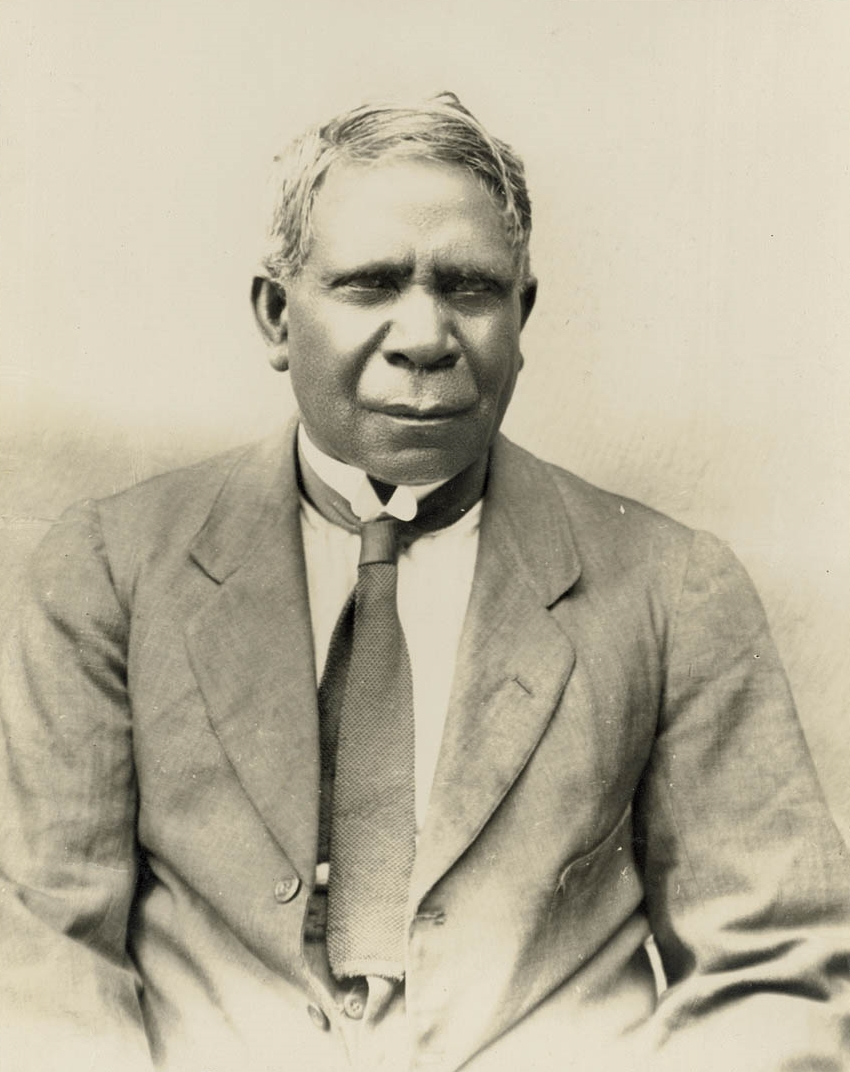
David Unaipon

- Ian Abdulla (1947–2011), artist
- Poltpalingada Booboorowie (Tommy Walker), a popular Adelaide personality in the 1890s
- Ruby Hunter, musician
- Doreen Kartinyeri (1935–2007), elder and historian
- Nathan Kreuger, Australian rules footballer
- Natascha McNamara, academic and activist
- Kysaiah Pickett, Australian rules footballer
- Izak Rankine, Australian rules footballer
- Moogy Sumner, elder, dancer, environmental activist
- David Unaipon, inventor and author, featured on the Australian $50 note
- James Unaipon, first Aboriginal deacon
- Michael Walters, Australian rules footballer
- Chad Wingard, Australian rules footballer
- Warrulan, taken to England as a child and died there aged about 19, in 1855
- The Deadly Nannas, musical group from the Murray Bridge area
- Trials, musician, producer and activist

== Some words ==
- kondoli (whale)
- korni/korne (man)
- kringkari, gringari (white man)
- muldarpi/mularpi (travelling spirit of sorcerers and strangers)
- yanun (speak, talk)

=== Animals extinct since colonisation ===
- maikari. Eastern hare-wallaby
- rtulatji. Toolache wallaby
- wi:kwai. Pig-footed bandicoot

Source: Hobson 2010, p. 398

== Sources ==
- Amery, Rob (2016). Warraparna Kaurna!: Reclaiming an Australian language. University of Adelaide Press. ISBN 978-1-925-26125-7.
- Bell, Diane (1998). Ngarrindjeri Wurruwarrin: A World that Is, Was, and Will be. Spinifex Press. p. 208. ISBN 978-1-875-55971-8.
- Bell, Diane (2008). "The Kumarangk Story". In Bell, Diane (ed.). Listen to Ngarrindjeri Women Speaking. Spinifex Press. pp. 16–19. ISBN 978-1-876-75669-7.
- Bell, Diane (2010). "Ngarrindjeri Women's Stories: Kungun and Yunnan". In Marcos, Sylvia (ed.). Women and Indigenous Religions. ABC-CLIO. pp. 3–20. ISBN 978-0-275-99157-9.
- Berndt, Ronald Murray; Berndt, Catherine Helen; Stanton, John E. (1993). A World that was: The Yaraldi of the Murray River and the Lakes, South Australia. University of British Columbia UBC Press. ISBN 978-0-774-80478-3.
- Broome, Richard (2019). Aboriginal Australians: A History Since 1788. Allen & Unwin. ISBN 978-1760528218.
- Brown, A. R. (July–December 1918). "Notes on the social organization of Australian tribes". The Journal of the Royal Anthropological Institute of Great Britain and Ireland. 48: 222–253. doi:10.2307/2843422. JSTOR 2843422.
- Brunton, Ron (14 February 1998). The Divide of Hindmarsh. Courier Mail, Institute of Public Affairs. ISBN 978-1-875-55971-8.
- Clarke, P.A. (2003). "Australian Aboriginal Mythology". In Parker, Janet; Stanton, Julie (eds.). Mythology. Myths, Legends, & Fantasies. Global Book Publishing. pp. 382–401. ISBN 978-0-785-81790-1.
- Dixon, Robert M. W. (2002). Australian Languages: Their Nature and Development. Vol. 1. Cambridge University Press. ISBN 978-0-521-47378-1.
- "Drought exposes Aboriginal burial grounds". ABC News. 31 May 2008.
- Fforde, Cressida; Hubert, Jane; Turnbull, Paul, eds. (2004). The Dead and Their Possessions. Routledge. pp. 78–79. ISBN 0-415-34449-2.
- Harris, John (1990). One Blood: 200 Years of Aboriginal Encounter with Christianity: a Story of Hope. Albatross Books. ISBN 978-0-867-60095-7.
- Hobson, John Robert (2010). Re-awakening Languages: Theory and Practice in the Revitalisation of Australia's Indigenous Languages. Sydney University Press. ISBN 978-1-920-89955-4.
- Horton, David R (1996). Aboriginal Australia (Map). Australian Institute of Aboriginal and Torres Strait Islander Studies – via Trove.
- Howitt, Alfred William (1904). The native tribes of south-east Australia (PDF). Macmillan.
- Jenkin, Graham (1979). Conquest of the Ngarrindjeri. Rigby. ISBN 978-0-727-01112-1.
- Krefft, Gerard (1865). "On the Manners and Customs of the Aborigines of the Lower Murray and Darling". Transactions of the Philosophical Society of New South Wales. 1862–1865: 357–374. doi:10.5962/p.345642. S2CID 253362944.
- McHughes, Eileene; Williams, Phyllis; Koolmatrie, Verna; Gale, Mary-Anne (2012). "Lakun Ngarrindjeri Thunggari: Weaving the Ngarrindjeri Language Back to Health". Australian Aboriginal Studies (2): 42–53.
- Meyer, Heinrich August Edward (1843). Vocabulary of the Language Spoken by the Aborigines of the Southern and Eastern Portions of the Settled Districts of South Australia (PDF). J. Allen. pp. 1–121.
- Ngadjuri Walpa Juri Lands and Heritage Association (n.d.). Gnadjuri. SASOSE Council. ISBN 0-646-42821-7.
- "Ngarrindjeri Murrundi Management Plan, No. 1" (PDF). Ngarrindjeri Regional Authority. June 2009. Archived from the original (PDF) on 15 March 2017.
- "Ngarrindjeri Regional Authority". Government of South Australia.
- "Ngunderi". South Australian Museum. Archived from the original on 30 September 2009.
- Pate, F Donald (2006). "Hunter-gatherer social complexity at Roonka Flat, South Australia" (PDF). In Bruno, David; Barker, Bryce; McNiven, Ian J (eds.). Social Archaeology of Australian Indigenous Societies. Aboriginal Studies Press. pp. 226–241. Archived from the original (PDF) on 3 April 2018.
- Russell, Lynette (2012). Roving Mariners: Australian Aboriginal Whalers and Sealers in the Southern Oceans, 1790–1870. SUNY Press. ISBN 978-1-438-44425-3.
- Simons, M. (2003). The Meeting of the Waters: The Hindmarsh Island Affair. Sydney: Hodder Headline. ISBN 0-7336-1348-9.
- Smith, C.; Wobst, H. (2005). Indigenous archaeologies: decolonizing theory and practice. Routledge. ISBN 0-415-30965-4.
- "Status of Indigenous Languages in South Australia" (PDF). Australian Institute of Aboriginal and Torres Strait Islander Studies. May 2002.
- Taplin, George (1878) [First published 1873]. "The Narrinyeri". The Native Tribes of South Australia (PDF). Adelaide: E.S. Wigg & Son. pp. 1–156.
- Taplin, George (1879). The Folklore, Manners, Customs, and Languages of the South Australian Aborigines (PDF). Adelaide: Government Printer.
- Taplin, George (1886). "From the banks of the Murray River, where it enters Lake Alexandrina to the Embouchure of that river and Lacepede Bay" (PDF). In Curr, Edward Micklethwaite (ed.). The Australian race: its origin, languages, customs, place of landing in Australia and the routes by which it spread itself over the continent. Vol. 2. Melbourne: J. Ferres. pp. 242–271.
- Tindale, Norman Barnett (1974). "Jarildekald (SA)". Aboriginal Tribes of Australia: Their Terrain, Environmental Controls, Distribution, Limits, and Proper Names. Australian National University Press. ISBN 978-0-708-10741-6. Archived from the original on 8 April 2017.
- Unaipon, D. (2001). Legendary Tales of the Australian Aborigines. Melbourne: The Miegunyah Press. ISBN 978-0-522-85246-2.
- Watson, Irene (2014). Aboriginal Peoples, Colonialism and International Law: Raw Law. Routledge. ISBN 978-1-317-93837-8.
- Weiner, James F. (August 1997). "'Bad Aboriginal' Anthropology: A Reply to Ron Brunton". Anthropology Today. 13 (4): 5–8. doi:10.2307/2783419. JSTOR 2783419.
- Woods, James Dominick; Taplin, George (1879). The Native Tribes of South Australia (PDF). E.S.Wigg.
