= Annie Isabel Rankine =

Aboriginal Australian community leader

Annie Isabel Rankine MBE
- Born: 27 February 1917; Raukkan
- Died: 11 June 1972 (aged 55); Tailem Bend
- Occupations: Community worker and leader
- Spouse: Hendle Henry Rankine
- Children: 9

Annie Isabel Rankine (26 February 1917 – 11 June 1972) was an Aboriginal Australian community leader of the Ngarrindjeri people.

== Early life ==
Annie Isabel Rankine was born in 1917 in Raukkan, South Australia, which was then called Point McLeay mission, an Aboriginal reserve. Her mother was Polly (born Beck) and her father was Clarence Long, both born in South Australia. She was their third child and in time she had ten siblings.

She married Hendle Henry Rankine in 1935 and in two rooms they raised nine children and fostered more.

== Career ==
The local Ngarrindjeri community was then run by outsiders and the Rankines were unusually trusted to organise themselves – freedoms not given to many of their peers. She worked for the community, attending and cleaning the church, and also cleaned the school.

The Point McLeay community council was created in 1968 and she was elected as its first chair. She had argued that her people needed to care for themselves and they should not be "spoon-fed". The community had never governed themselves until 1974, when it became responsible for its own governance.

== Honours ==
Rankine's work in her community was recognised in 1970 when she became a Member of The Most Excellent Order of the British Empire (MBE) in the Queen's 1970 Birthday Honours.

== Death and legacy ==
Rankine died in the hospital in Tailem Bend in 1972. Three of her five sons and one of her four daughters died before her. Her three surviving daughters worked at the Aboriginal Women's Home. The home in North Adelaide provided accommodation for Aboriginal women and their children, who had few other alternatives, while they accessed medical care.

She was succeeded as the chair of Point McLeay community council by her son, Henry. He followed her lead and he became a justice of the peace. He was also a storyteller. In 1992 he was also recognised, this time with a Medal of the Order of Australia (OAM).
