= Hindmarsh Island bridge controversy =

1990s controversy involving indigenous land rights

Hindmarsh Island bridge
- Interactive map of Hindmarsh Island bridge

Geography
- Coordinates: 35°30.3′S 138°47.35′E

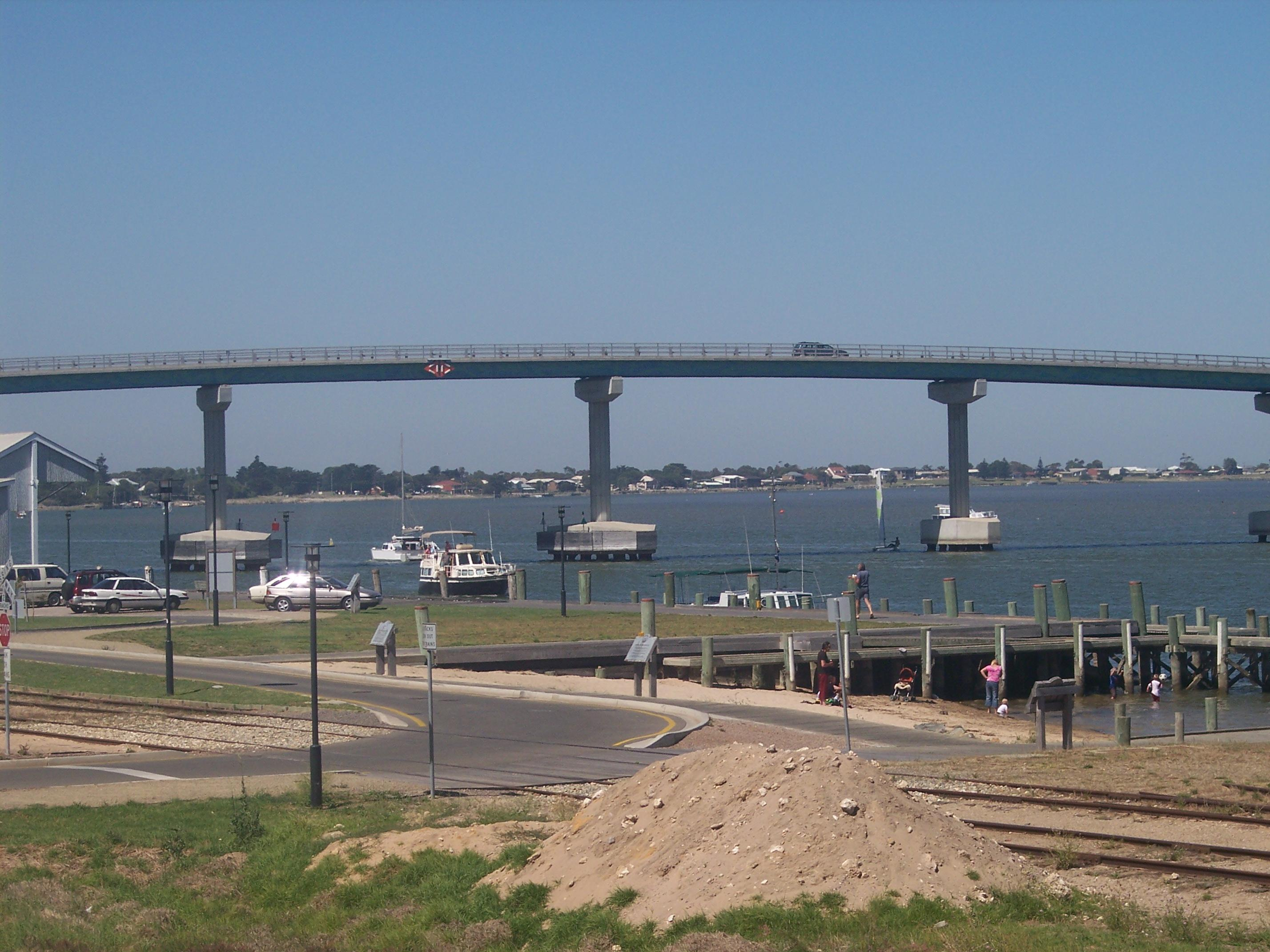
View of the Hindmarsh Island Bridge from the Goolwa wharf.

The Hindmarsh Island bridge controversy was a 1990s Australian legal and political controversy that involved the clash of local Aboriginal Australian sacred culture and property rights. A proposed bridge to Hindmarsh Island, near Goolwa, South Australia, intended to replace the existing cable ferry and service a proposed marina development, attracted opposition from many local residents, environmental groups, and Indigenous leaders.

In 1994, a group of Ngarrindjeri women elders claimed the site was sacred to them for reasons that could not be revealed. The case attracted much controversy because the issue intersected with broader concerns about Indigenous rights, specifically Aboriginal land rights, in the Australian community at the time, and coincided with the Mabo and Wik High Court cases regarding native title in Australia.

"Secret women's business", as the group's claims became known, became the subject of intense legal battles. Some Ngarrindjeri women came forward to dispute the veracity of the claims. The Hindmarsh Island Royal Commission found that "secret women's business" had been fabricated. Subsequently, the Howard government passed the Hindmarsh Island Bridge Act 1997 (Cth), which allowed construction to go ahead. The bridge was completed in March 2001.

In August 2001, a civil case in the Federal Court of Australia re-ignited the debate. In rejecting claims for damages by the developers, Justice John von Doussa stated that he was not satisfied that the claims of "secret women's business" had been fabricated, although never explicitly stating them to be true. The Ngarrindjeri and their supporters took the decision as a vindication, and many organisations subsequently apologised.

== Background ==
In 1977, Adelaide developers Tom and Wendy Chapman, trading as Binalong Pty Ltd, purchased 30 hectares (74 acres) of land on Hindmarsh Island in the Murray River estuary and later received planning permission for their company to build a 560-berth marina, car parking, residential development, conference centre, golf course and associated buildings. Wendy Chapman was a former Lord Mayor of Adelaide from 1983 to 1985.

With the marina only partially completed, in 1988 the Chapmans applied for permission to increase the size of the project, as the original project was found to be financially unviable. The Planning Assessment Commission rejected the proposal, stating that the development couldn't expand unless a bridge was built from Goolwa to Hindmarsh Island, as the existing cable ferry would not be able to handle the increased traffic. In October 1989, approval was granted for a bridge, to be financed by the Chapmans, subject to an Environmental Impact Study (EIS). The EIS (the Edmonds Report) was completed within two weeks and identified the need for an anthropological study. The Chapmans funded a study by Rod Lucas, who reported in January 1990 that existing written records did not record mythological sites, but cautioned that consultation with Indigenous groups would be required.

=== Indigenous heritage ===
The Ngarrindjeri are one of the 30–40 clan-groups (lakinyeri) that inhabited the colony of South Australia at the time of white settlement. Originally numbering around 6,000 members, they are the only tribe in Australia whose land lay within 100 km (62 mi) of a capital city to have survived as a distinct people, as recognised in the 2002 Kungun Ngarrindjeri Yunnan Agreement.

In April 1990, the State Minister for Environment and Planning wrote to the Chapmans granting them planning permission for the bridge to Hindmarsh Island and the extensions to their marina. The estimated cost of the bridge was around $6 million which was considerably more than the estimated value of the marina once completed. The planning permission was subject to a number of conditions, including the requirements for consultation with "relevant Aboriginal representative bodies" such as Ngarrendjeri Elders, the Raukkan Community Council, the Ngarrendjeri Lands and Progress Association, and the Lower Murray Heritage Committee.

This was to become an issue in 1994, as the Chapmans had clearly not met these requirements. Although the Chapmans had done several environmental impact studies, submitted plans that included the bridge to the Raukkan Community Council and had also consulted with Henry Rankin, a senior Ngarrendjeri Elder, in November 1989 this was prior to the planning permission for the bridge being granted on condition of additional consultation. In the Federal Court hearing in 1994, Wendy Chapman gave evidence that the page of the letter setting out these additional consultation requirements was missing from the Minister's letter she had received (the same recommendations were also included in an assessment sent to the Chapmans by the Department of Environment and Planning). She also stated her belief that as no skeletal remains had been found, no further consultation was required.

=== Government assistance ===
The Hindmarsh Island marina was at this time losing money and the Chapmans were in financial difficulties due to the failure of another marina project they had built at Wellington. They could not afford to construct the bridge themselves so they approached the State Government for assistance.

Beneficial Finance, a subsidiary of the state owned State Bank of South Australia, had supplied the financing for the marina development. By 1990 it was obvious that the State Bank was having financial difficulties and The State Labor government led by Premier John Bannon was anxious to protect Beneficial's large investment in the Chapman's projects. The government was also under pressure for a series of major projects it had promised that had never eventuated so the bridge project was also seen as likely to be the only major success Labor would be able to claim for the next election.

The state government made a deal with the Chapmans. Binalong would pay up front for the bridge to be built. Then the state government would reimburse Binalong for half of the cost of construction, up to a limit of $3 million.

=== Legal liability ===
In September 1990 Beneficial Finance decided to withdraw funding and the Chapmans approached Partnership Pacific, a subsidiary of Westpac, to take over the financing. Partnership Pacific agreed but only with the condition that the state government paid the entire cost of the bridge. A secret meeting was arranged between the Chapmans, Westpac, and the government, at which it was accepted that the government would pay the whole cost of the bridge, while the Chapmans would pay back half at a later date, but only after Binalong had paid off all its debts to Westpac. Binalong owed so much money to the State Bank through Beneficial Finance that Bannon apparently had no choice but to prop the company up. The State Bank collapsed not long after with debts of $3 billion.

On 22 November 1990, Premier Bannon wrote a personal letter to the managing director of Westpac, Stewart Fowler, guaranteeing government financing of the bridge and in February 1991, Cabinet approved the funding agreement as outlined in the Premier's letter. Initially the government had no liability beyond paying half the cost of the bridge. However, Bannon's letter had created an unintended liability for the state government. Not only was the government liable for Westpac's losses if it did not build the bridge, but even if the bridge was built and Westpac suffered any losses from stages two, three, and four of the marina project, the government was now also liable to cover those losses which could run to hundreds of millions of dollars.

A deed was signed in March 1993 binding the government to this commitment. Public outrage at government funding of a project for the sole benefit of private developers led South Australian Legislative Council member and leader of the Australian Democrats, Mike Elliott, to call for a parliamentary inquiry into the bridge and the financial arrangements between the government and Westpac. One of its terms of reference dealt specifically with the propriety of the government's decision in conferring private benefits at taxpayers' expense. The inquiry’s findings criticised the financial arrangements between the government, the Chapmans, and Westpac, and recommended that the government reconsider the bridge and examine whether the bridge could be replaced by a second ferry.

In early October, the Lower Murray Heritage Committee wrote to the Aboriginal Affairs Minister asking him to protect Aboriginal sites on Hindmarsh Island. However, work on the bridge began on 27 October 1993, although it quickly ceased due to industrial action.

=== 1993 election ===
Largely due to the financial disaster of the State Bank collapse leaving the state essentially bankrupt, Labor was routed in the December 1993 election and the Liberals came to power with Dean Brown as Premier. When in opposition the Liberals had campaigned against the Hindmarsh Island Bridge and stopping it was a campaign promise during the election. Further up the Murray, the local community in Berri was campaigning for a much-needed bridge to replace their ferry and the government had agreed to build it. Seeking a way out of the Hindmarsh Island contract, Premier Brown hired Samuel Jacobs QC, to carry out an investigation into the legal responsibilities of the contract.

Shortly before the 1993 elections the Labor government had instructed archaeologist, Dr Neil Draper, to survey Hindmarsh Island and the mainland foreshore for Aboriginal sites. Justice Jacobs, unaware of Draper's survey, finished his report in early 1994, concluding there was no way out of building the bridge without significant financial liabilities. On 29 April 1994, Draper presented his report to the new Liberal government. The report mentioned that the area had spiritual significance to Aboriginal women, identified a number of significant sites and argued that they should be protected under the State Aboriginal Heritage Act. On 3 May the State Minister for Aboriginal Affairs, Dr Michael Armitage, now used his powers under the act to authorise damage to the identified sites if required for the bridge to proceed. Work recommenced and a number of protestors were arrested. It has since been pointed out that Justice Jacobs and the government had missed an opportunity to cancel the bridge contract. They had overlooked that Aboriginal Heritage legislation overrides all contractual obligations.

== Opposition ==
Many people, including a majority of the island's inhabitants, variously opposed the government funding of a project for the benefit of private developers, the urbanisation of Hindmarsh Island and/or the effects it would have on the natural environment had also voiced their opposition. Initiating legal action in April 1994 they applied to the federal government for an order prohibiting construction.

On 12 May, shortly before construction began, at the request of the Ngarrindjeri, the Federal Minister for Aboriginal Affairs, Robert Tickner issued an emergency declaration blocking work on the bridge, and then appointed a lawyer, Professor Cheryl Saunders OA, to report on the significant Aboriginal sites. Saunders consulted with a range of interested parties, including a group of Ngarrindjeri women who claimed Hindmarsh Island was sacred to them as a fertility site, and for other reasons that could not be publicly revealed. An anthropologist, Dr Deane Fergie, prepared an assessment of the women's claims, which was then submitted to Saunders. As a part of this process some of these cultural secrets were written down and sealed in two envelopes marked Confidential: to be read by women only and forwarded to Tickner with the assessment. On 10 July 1994, Tickner placed a 25-year ban on the bridge construction putting the marina in doubt and bringing the Chapmans close to bankruptcy.

In February 1995 the Chapmans initiated a legal challenge of the ban in the Federal Court. Although the Judge praised Saunders report and criticised the Chapman's litigation, the judge overturned the ban due to the failure of the minister to consider representations personally, as required by the Aboriginal and Torres Strait Islander Heritage Protection Act 1984 (Cth). The media had heavily criticised the ban and focused on Tickner issuing it based on the contents of sealed envelopes that he had never read. In fact Saunders' assessment had stressed that the contents were not needed to reach a decision, as there was enough evidence supporting their contents in the assessment and public domain. In fact, Tickner is on record in the February court case as stating that his decision was not based on the envelopes' contents.

In March, Shadow Minister for the Environment Ian McLachlan was forced to resign after tabling some of the secret documents in Parliament misrepresenting how he obtained them and falsely claiming they had not been marked "Confidential". The envelope had been delivered to McLachlan's office in error and despite being clearly marked "Confidential: to be read by women only" had been read, photocopied and circulated among both male and female staff.

In May 1995 the media and politicians aired the claims of five "dissident" Aboriginal women who stated that what had become known as "secret women's business" must have been "fabricated" by the "proponents" because they either had no knowledge of the secrets or did not believe them.

=== Secret women's business ===
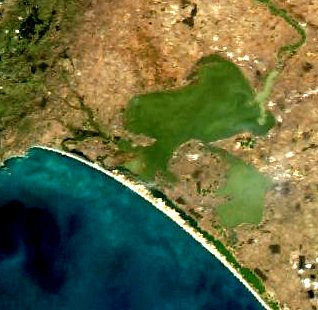
One of the pivotal assertions of "secret women's business" was that the geography of Hindmarsh Island resembled the female reproductive organs. Hindmarsh Island can be seen in the centre-left of the image.

The Royal Commission identified at least twelve separate aspects to the claim of "secret women's business" during the course of its inquiry. This knowledge was claimed to be of great antiquity, and passed only to a small number of properly initiated women, hence the ignorance of prior anthropologists to the myth. The most prominent aspects of the claims are listed below:

- That the island was regarded as a fertility site, as its shape and that of the surrounding wetlands resembled female reproductive anatomy when viewed from the air. It was also suggested that the Ngarrindjeri name for the island, Kumarangk, was similar to the word for pregnancy, or woman.
- That the island had to remain separate from the mainland – creating a permanent link (such as a bridge) would be "as disastrous as if two bodily organs were connected together".
- That the proposed bridge might interfere with the "meeting of the waters", the mixing of salt and sea water in the Goolwa estuary, which was believed to be crucial for Ngarrindjeri fertility. Judge Stevens concluded that there was no distinction between the existing barrages (which do physically prevent water mixing) and building a bridge with respect to this aspect.
- That the waters of the Goolwa channel required uninterrupted views of the sky, particularly the Seven Sisters star cluster, which features in several Aboriginal Dreaming stories. The existing barrages, built in the 1930s, were claimed to be acceptable because they did not create a barrier between water and sky.
- That the island was a place where Aboriginal women went to abort foetuses conceived with white men. This particular practice could not have dated from prior to around 1820, when British whalers began to frequent the area.
- Although unrelated to secret women's business, the lower River Murray features prominently in the Ngarrindjeri creation myth. Many of the geographical features of the Fleurieu Peninsula are believed to be remnants of the bodies of creation hero, Ngurunderi, and his wives.
- Archaeological evidence suggests that the site was probably used for ritual burials.

== Binalong fails ==
In 1994, Binalong went into liquidation owing Partnership Pacific $18.5 million with Westpac taking possession of the marina as mortgagee. The marina was at this time valued at up to $1.35 million. Following protracted negotiations, in September 1997 Westpac sold the marina to Kebaro Pty Ltd, a family trust belonging to the Chapmans for $50,000 with a further $1.3 million to follow at a later date. A further assessment of the marina now revised its value to $4.5 million. As part of the transaction, the liquidator of Binalong agreed to assign Binalong's causes of action to Mr and Mrs Chapman who would then pay a percentage of any damages recovered in court to the liquidators. In regards to the financial losses the Chapmans believed had resulted from the heritage applications, the Chapmans claimed financial losses of $16.58 million based on the difference between what the Chapmans paid Westpac and what they claimed the completed marina would have sold for had the bridge been built prior to 1994. In 2001 this court action failed.

== Royal Commission ==
In June 1995, the Hindmarsh Island Royal Commission was called by the South Australian government, following South Australian media reports of five Ngarrindjeri women disputing the existence of "secret women's business" on the island. The Commission provoked significant and lasting controversy over its five month deliberation. The women who asserted the existence of "secret women's business" refused to give evidence to the Royal Commission on the basis that it was an unlawful inquiry into their spiritual beliefs.

The "dissident women" were diverse in age and cultural traditions or awareness, and were considered by the Commissioner to be 'credible' and their testimony was corroborated by support from two anthropologists from the South Australian Museum.

In December the Royal Commission found that the idea of Hindmarsh Island as being significant to the Ngarrindjerri women had come about at the meeting of the Lower Murray Aboriginal Heritage Committee. Despite evidence that the island had been mentioned as a fertility site in 1967, predating the meeting, the Royal Commission found that the secret women's business was a fabrication for the purpose of obtaining protection under the Aboriginal and Torres Strait Islander Heritage Protection Act 1984 (Cth). They considered the "history of the events, the anthropological evidence and the evidence of the dissident women" to draw this conclusion.

== Heritage applications ==
The first Section 10 application brought by the so-called "proponent women" in 1994 under the Aboriginal and Torres Strait Islander Heritage Protection Act 1984 (Cth) succeeded. On the basis of the Report of Law Professor Cheryl Saunders (1994), Minister Robert Tickner declared a 25-year ban on the building of a bridge. That ban was overturned on a technicality. The veracity of the proponent's women story was not at issue. They had told their story and been believed but the Minister had erred in the manner in which he had dealt with the material.

The Ngarrindjeri brought another application under the federal heritage act in 1995–6. This time Senator Rosemary Crowley appointed a woman judge, Jane Mathews, to be the reporter and thus the proponent women would be able to include knowledge restricted to women without violating their cultural rules. However, the Mathews Report was not able to run its full course. In 1996 the Howard Liberal government came to power and Minister Herron refused to appoint a woman to receive the report. Then, following the Federal Court judgment in Minister for Aboriginal and Torres Strait Islander Affairs v Western Australia, Mathews (1996: 43–6) made it plain that the women could not rely on material that was not being made available to the other parties most closely affected by the application. Rather than have their stories read by a male minister and made available to other parties, the women withdrew their restricted material. They chose not to violate their religious law that women's knowledge was for women's eyes only. Although this knowledge was missing, the Mathews Report of June 1996 nonetheless acknowledges that the area of the proposed bridge was of significance.

The dissident Ngarrindjeri women sought a declaration from the High Court that the nomination of Justice Mathews as the reporter was incompatible with her commission as a judge of the Federal Court of Australia. On 6 September 1996, the majority of the court agreed that the appointment of Justice Mathews was invalid.

== Permission and construction (1997–2001) ==
In part due to the furore over the bridge, Tickner lost his own seat in the 1996 election, at which Labor was heavily defeated by the Coalition under John Howard. Soon after coming to power, the Howard government legislated to allow the bridge to proceed. The Hindmarsh Island Bridge Act 1997 (Cth) removed protections granted by the Heritage Protection Act to the construction of a bridge and related activities in the Hindmarsh Island bridge area.

Doreen Kartinyeri and Neville Gollan, speaking on behalf of the Ngarrindjeri people, challenged the legislation in the High Court. They argued that section 51(xxvi) of the Constitution as amended by the 1967 referendum only authorised laws for the benefit of the people of the Aboriginal race. Five judges held that the Bridge Act was valid, with Justice Kirby dissenting. Judgments regarding the ambit of section 51(xxvi) noted that the actual wording of the amended section did not limit Parliament to the enactment of only beneficial laws. This controversial judgment did little to limit the scope of section 51(xxvi), and has been criticised for failing to create adequate protections against discriminatory legislation and disregarding the context of the 1967 amendment.

The bridge was completed in March 2001.

== The Von Doussa decision (2001) ==
In August 2001, a civil case was brought by the Chapmans against Luminis in the Federal Court of Australia, Chapman v Luminis Pty Ltd (No 5) re-ignited the debate.

In rejecting claims for damages by the developers, Justice John von Doussa stated that he was not satisfied that the claims of "secret women's business" had been fabricated, although never explicitly stating them to be true. Justice von Doussa heard from all parties to the dispute in the course of the action brought by the Chapmans. In the summary of his Reasons for Decision in 2001, von Doussa stated:

5. This action seeks damages for losses allegedly suffered by Binalong from five respondents. Mr Tickner is sued as the former Minister. Professor Cheryl Saunders is sued as the person nominated by Mr Tickner under the Australian Heritage Protection Act to receive representations from interested members of the public and to prepare the report required by the Act concerning the application for protection. Luminis Pty Ltd (Luminis) and Dr Deane Fergie are sued in respect of their provision of consultancy services to the ALRM including the preparation of a report containing an anthropological evaluation of the significance of secret women's knowledge within Aboriginal tradition to the area where the bridge was to be constructed. The last respondent is the Commonwealth of Australia which is sued for compensation on the basis that the declaration under the Heritage Protection Act resulted in the acquisition of property belonging to Binalong.

Von Doussa found for the respondents. His findings took issue with those of the Royal Commission of 1996 finding that the main bases for the Royal Commission conclusion were not established. In particular, the late emergence of the knowledge did not provide proof of fabrication and is expected in the case of genuine sacred information, lack of recording in the literature was not inconsistent with the material, that it was inappropriate to assert that a particular spiritual belief was irrational, Wilson's testimony was not reliable and Milera's was a personal belief and not evidence of fabrication. Most significantly, the various accounts of the Seven Sisters story given were consistent. He wrote:

12. ... the evidence received by the Court on this topic is significantly different to that which was before the Royal Commission. Upon the evidence before this Court I am not satisfied that the restricted women's knowledge was fabricated or that it was not part of genuine Aboriginal tradition.

One of the two key independent expert witnesses from the South Australian Museum, Philip Clarke, was found by the Federal Court at [373] to have erred in terms of professional objectivity before the Royal Commission when it was discovered that he had been secretly helping the lawyers for the "dissident" Ngarrindjerri women. The court found against the developers and dismissed the claims of fabrication.

The Ngarrindjeri women and their supporters took the decision as a vindication, and many organisations subsequently apologised.

== Aftermath ==
Developers Tom and Wendy Chapman and their son Andrew took defamation action against conservation groups, academics, politicians, media operators, printers and individuals who had spoken out against the bridge. The Chapmans received court judgements of around $850,000 in their favour. The bulk of the damages related to claims by the defendants that the Chapmans had used SLAPP accusations to silence them.

During the defamation case the defendants relied heavily on the defence of "fair comment upon a matter of public interest" and the "Lange Defence" (/ˈlɒŋi/ LONG-ee – the constitutional right to freedom of speech on political matters). However the court found that these defences did not apply because the defendants were motivated by malice which had been proven by the defendants, being engaged in a "campaign" to stop the bridge, and the "targeting" of the Chapmans. The judgement was of concern to environmental activists because any form of direct action such as non-violent picketing, boycotting, or attempts to coerce changes of policy or behaviour, while not illegal, could be imputed as "malice" in any resulting defamation claim.

As a result of the Chapman defamation actions, the Environmental Defenders Office called for the introduction of a Protection of Public Participation Act for South Australia. Based on North American legislation, the proposed Act would ensure that those engaged in non-violent public participation would be protected from threats or suits that infringe free speech.

In early 2002, Peter Sutton, a former head of anthropology at the South Australian Museum, who had been unable to take a position on the claims, stated that additional evidence discovered since the von Doussa judgement had changed his view. "I still allow that aspects of these beliefs may have been embellished or given greater weight than before ... but the patterns and matches with earlier materials on some strands makes the overall fabrication theory insupportable".

In September 2002, redevelopment of the Goolwa wharf, which lay adjacent the Hindmarsh Island bridge, unearthed the remains of an Aboriginal woman and child. The site had been said to have been a former burial ground by the proponent Ngarrindjeri women during the Royal Commission. However, the Alexandrina Council decided that as the wharf was South Australia's first inland port, colonial history should take precedence over Ngarrindjeri interests and construction went ahead. Legal action was contemplated but after negotiations, the Alexandrina Council formally apologised to the Ngarrindjeri and entered into a Kungun Ngarrindjeri Yunnan ("Listen to Ngarrindjeri Speaking") agreement where the Council acknowledged Ngarrindjeri rights as the traditional owners of the country and their existence as an identifiable group of people with their own laws, customs, beliefs and traditions, which must be taken into consideration for any developments within the council area where the Ngarrindjeri may have rights, interests or obligations.

On 7 July 2010, in a ceremony at the foot of the bridge, the Government of South Australia endorsed the finding that the "secret women's business" was genuine. Ngarrindjeri elders then led a symbolic walk across the bridge. Elders agreed that it is acceptable for Ngarrindjeri people to use the bridge to gain access to their land and waters, but culturally and morally still reject the bridge.

== In the arts ==
A 26-minute documentary film about the issues, Kumarangk 5214, was written and directed by Jessica Wallace and co-produced by Rebecca Summerton, who worked closely with Sandra Saunders, Doreen Katinyeri, and other Ngarrindjeri women. The film premiered in the "Hot Docs" section of the Adelaide Film Festival in 2001, screened to a packed cinema. It includes a weekend film shoot in which women from all over come together to weave, yarn, and share stories of their families.

Kumarangk, a major theatre project written by Wotjobaluk and Ngarrindjeri playwright and screenwriter Tracey Rigney and directed by Glenn Shea and produced by Country Arts SA, was funded in the first round of the Creative Futures Fund in July 2025. It tells the story of the women who led community resistance against the construction of the bridge, and is guided by the cultural stewardship of the women who were involved at the time. There will be a performance on Country, along with an exhibition and a documentary film.

The feature documentary KUMARANGK: Sacred Women's Business, directed by Tracey Rigney, has its world premiere at the 2026 Adelaide Film Festival on 17 October 2026, in a sold-out screening. The film, which was produced by Joshua Trevorrow and Carolyn Johnson, filmed by Johanis Lyons-Reid and edited by Tania Nehme and Andrea Lang, includes interviews as well as archival footage from the 1980s and 1990s.
