= List of Aboriginal schools in South Australia =

The following comprise a list of Aboriginal schools in South Australia.

== Preschools and kindergartens ==
- Kalaya Children's Centre, Queenstown, South Australia
- Kaurna Plains, Elizabeth, South Australia
  - Preschool School
  - Child Care

== Schools ==
- Amata Anangu School, Amata
- Carlton Primary School, Port Augusta
- Ernabella Anangu School, Pukatja
- Fregon Anangu School, Kaltjiti
- Indulkana Anangu School, Iwantja
- Kaurna Plains School, Elizabeth
- Kenmore Park Anangu School, Yunyarinyi
- Koonibba Aboriginal School, Koonibba
- Marree Aboriginal School, Marree
- Mimili Anangu School, Mimili
- Murputja Anangu School, Murputja
- Oak Valley Anunga School, Oak Valley
- Oodnadatta Aboriginal School, Oodnadatta
- Pipalyatjara Anangu School, Pipalyatjara
- Point Pearce Aboriginal School, Point Pearce
- Raukkan Aboriginal School, Raukkan
- Warriappendi Secondary School, Thebarton
- Yalata Anangu School, Yalata

== See also ==
- List of schools in South Australia
- Anangu Schools
