= Ian Abdulla =

Aboriginal Australian artist

- Born: 1947; Swan Reach, South Australia, Australia
- Died: 29 January 2011 (aged 63–64); Berri, South Australia, Australia
- Other name: Mr Ian W. Abdullah
- Known for: Painting, contemporary Indigenous Australian art

Ian Abdulla (1947 – 29 January 2011) was an Aboriginal Australian contemporary artist. A Ngarrindjeri man who grew up on the banks of the Murray in South Australia, he has been called Australia's greatest naive artist.

== Early life ==
Abdulla was born in 1947 at Swan Reach, on the Murray River, in the Murraylands region of South Australia. His art depicts the landscape and activities of this area, with a strong storytelling element.

== Career ==
In 1988, Abdulla learned printmaking at a workshop in Glossop, and the following year he began painting. In 1991 Abdulla was named South Australian Aboriginal Artist of the Year, and was awarded an Australia Council Fellowship in 1992. His book, As I Grew Older was awarded the Australian Multicultural Children's Literature Award in 1994 and, Tucker was short-listed for the Children's Book Council Eve Pownall Award for Information Books in 1995.

Abdulla's work featured on the cover of the World Health Organization's annual report. His works have been exhibited around the world and form part of the permanent collection at the Art Gallery of South Australia and the Art Gallery of New South Wales.

== Death ==
On the morning of 29 January, at the age of 63, he died at the Berri Hospital, South Australia after a brief battle with cancer. His family was by his side.

== Style ==
His works are distinct for their juxtaposition of text and image against a flattened foreground. Abdulla's handpainted annotations briefly describe the scene depicted and are placed dead centre at the top of his paintings.

== Works ==
=== Books ===
- Abdulla, Ian W. (1993). As I grew older: the life and times of a Nunga growing up along the Murray River. Norwood, South Australia: Omnibus Books. p. 40. ISBN 1-86291-160-6.
- Abdulla, Ian W. (1994). Tucker. Norwood, South Australia: Omnibus Books. p. 36. ISBN 1-86291-206-8.

=== Artworks ===
- Swimming before school (1995), synthetic polymer paint on canvas, 239.5 x 160.0 cm stretcher. Art Gallery of New South Wales, Sydney, Australia.
- Pelicans at Katarapko (1994), synthetic polymer paint on canvas, 121.8 x 151.5 x 4.0 cm stretcher. Art Gallery of New South Wales, Sydney, Australia.

== Sources ==
- "Ian Abdulla". George Negus Tonight. 26 May 2003. Australian Broadcasting Corporation.
- "Deadly Artists: Ian Abdulla". Deadly Artists Online. Archived from the original on 7 December 2011. (includes a list of major exhibitions)

River, Land, Memory: the work of Ian Abdulla, Adelaide Festival of Arts, on display at the Flinders University Art Museum, 2002. Nicholls, Christine, 2002, River, Land and Memory, The Work of Ian Abdulla, In Conversation: Ian Abdulla and Christine Nicholls, in exhibition catalogue River, Land and Memory, The Work of Ian Abdulla, Flinders University, Adelaide, Australia.

March 2002, Interview of Ian Abdulla and Christine Nicholls, with Ian Henscke, ABC Television, South Australia.
