= Natascha McNamara =

Australian academic, researcher and activist

Natascha McNamara AM MBE
- Born: 1935 (age 90–91); Clare, South Australia, Australia
- Occupations: Academic, researcher
- Awards: Member of the Order of the British Empire; Member of the Order of Australia

Natascha Duschene McNamara AM, MBE (born 1935 in Clare, South Australia) is an Ngarrindjeri Australian academic, activist, and researcher. She co-founded the Aboriginal Training and Cultural Institute in Balmain, New South Wales and served as President of the Aboriginal Children's Advancement Society Ltd. Her affiliations include: Fellowship, Centre of Indigenous Development Education and Research, University of Wollongong (as Adjunct Senior Researcher); member, Australian Press Council; and Member, Australian Institute of Aboriginal and Torres Strait Islander Studies Council.

== Awards and honours ==
- Member of the Order of the British Empire (Civil list), 3 June 1978
- Member of the Order of Australia (AM), 8 June 1992.

== Sources ==
- Horton, David (editor), The Encyclopaedia of Aboriginal Australia: Aboriginal and Torres Strait Islander history, society and culture, Aboriginal Studies Press for AIATSIS, Canberra, 1994, 2 v. (p. xxxiii); Australian Press Council.
