= George Taplin =

English minister and anthropologist (1831–1879)

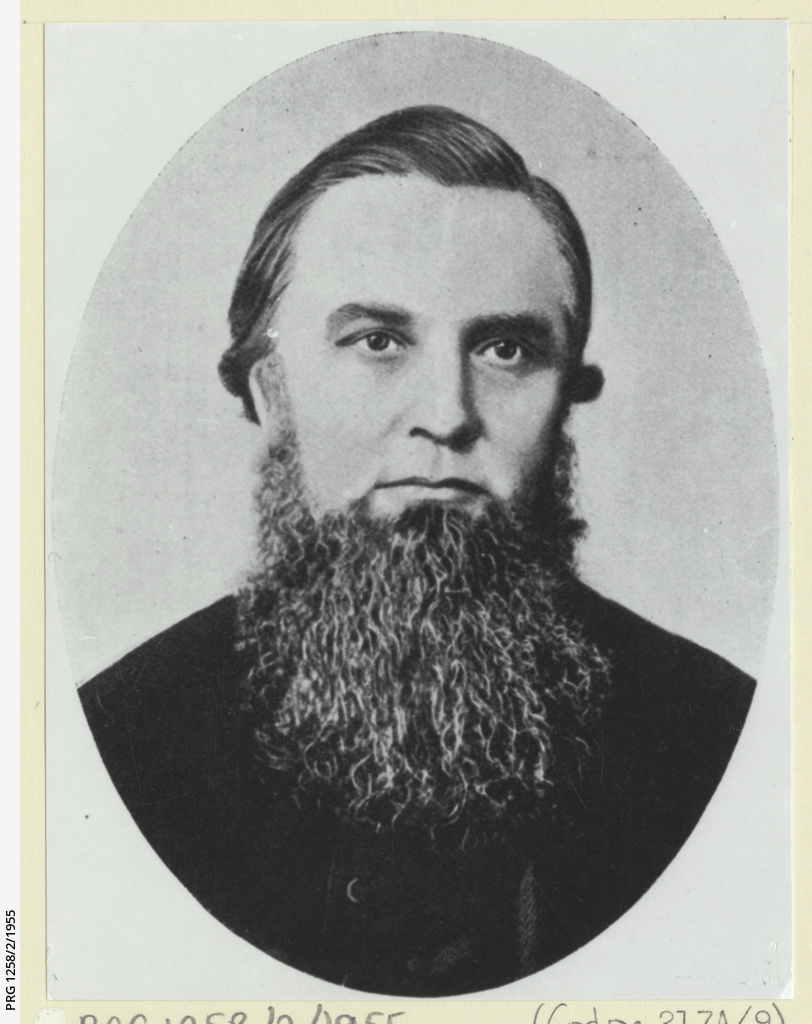
- Born: 24 August 1831

George Taplin (24 August 1831 – 24 June 1879) was a Congregationalist minister who worked in Aboriginal missions in South Australia, and gained a reputation as an anthropologist as well, writing on Ngarrindjeri lore and customs.

== History ==
Taplin was born in Kingston upon Thames, Surrey, and educated at a private school in Andover, Hampshire, where he lived with his maternal grandmother. He was trained for the legal profession but had ambitions to serve as a missionary.

He left for Australia in 1849, and arrived at Adelaide in the Anna Maria on 12 October 1849. He worked for a time as a lawyer's clerk, and made the acquaintance of Rev. T. Q. Stow, with whom he boarded while studying for the ministry. While living there he married Stow's servant girl Martha Burnell, who also felt destined for missionary work. In October 1853 they left to help at a mission school in Currency Creek then in February 1854 opened a school at Port Elliot.

The school was taken over by the Education Department, but he stayed on as a teacher until 1859, when the Aborigines' Friends' Association appointed him to teach at Point McLeay Aboriginal Mission, now Raukkan, on the shores of Lake Alexandrina, in Narrinyeri (or Ngarrindjeri) country. The mission prospered and did much good work, despite opposition from local landholder John Baker.

Taplin had a keen interest in Ngarrindjeri culture, learned their language, and published Biblical writings in the local dialect. He also wrote on Ngarrindjeri lore and culture, which have great anthropological value. He believed that the best chance for the people to advance was to gain acceptance in European society, and that literacy, adoption of Christian values, and learning trades were essential steps in that process.

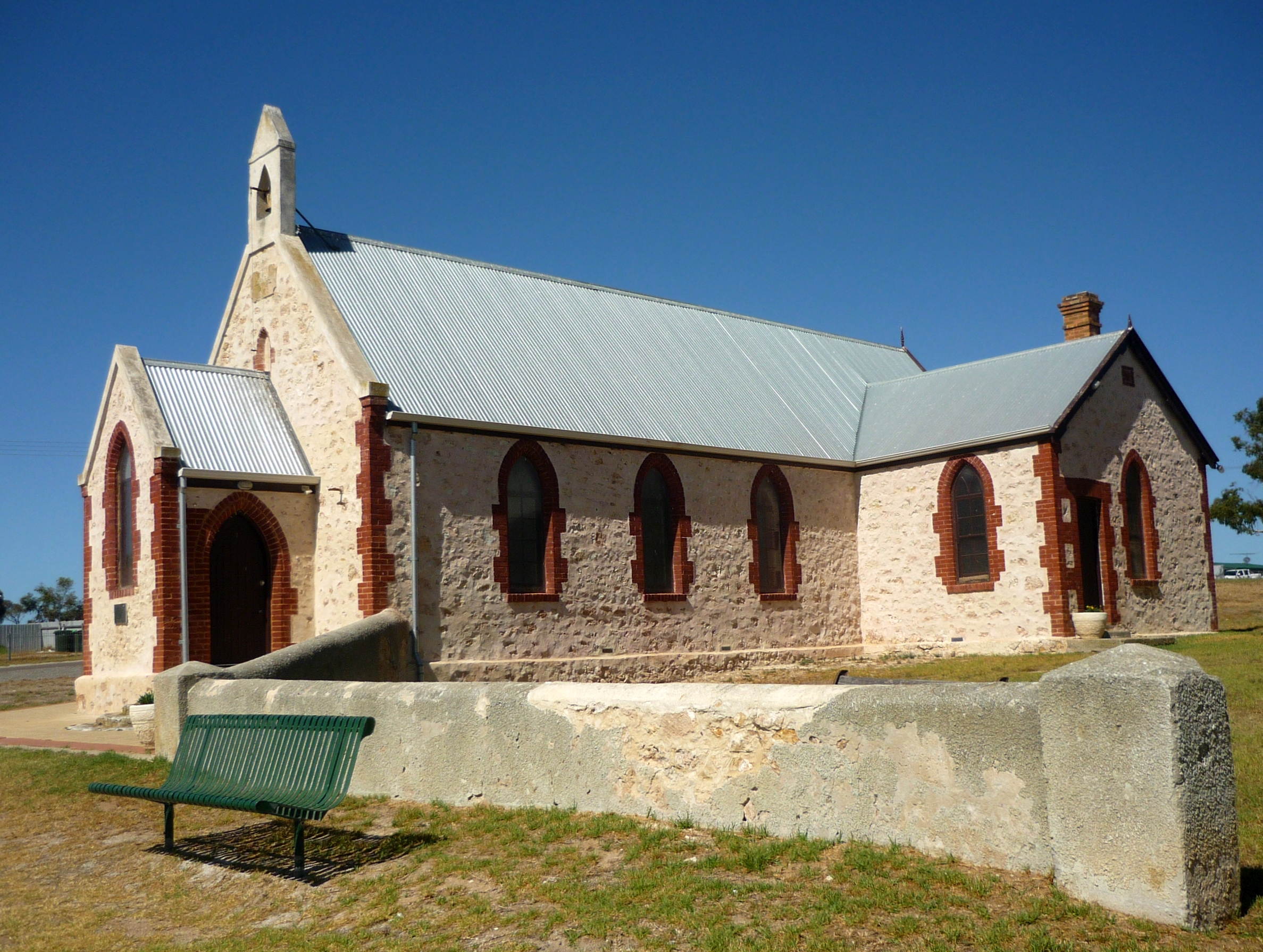
Raukkan Church, South Australia

In 1868 Taplin was ordained by the Congregational Church and the following year a chapel was completed. He died at Point McLeay (now known by the Aboriginal name Raukkan) in 1879 and was buried in the village graveyard. His position as head of the Mission was taken by his son Frederick William Taplin. His wife, who had endeared herself to the community, died in 1901.

== Bibliography ==
- Taplin, George, The Narrinyeri J. T. Shawyer, Adelaide, 1874

Second, enlarged edition (E. S. Wigg & Son, Adelaide 1878)

- Woods, J. D. (editor) Native Tribes of South Australia
- Taplin, George (editor), The Folklore, Manners, Customs, and Languages of the South Australian Aborigines (1879)

This work had just been completed when Taplin died.

== Family ==
Taplin married Martha Burnell (died 1901) on 28 February 1853. They had six children:

- Frederick William Taplin (1854–1889)
- Mary Grace Taplin (1855–) married David Blackwell in 1897
- Charles Eaton Taplin (1857–1927) was secretary of the Council of Churches in South Australia 1900–1905
- Kate Wiltshire Taplin (1862– ) married John Jones in 1894
- Esther Taplin (1865 – 11 July 1929)
- Walter Edward/Edward Walter Taplin (1866–1888)

== Sources ==
- G. K. Jenkin (1976). "Australian Dictionary of Biography: Taplin, George (1831–1879)". National Centre of Biography, Australian National University.
