= Hindmarsh Island Royal Commission =

1995 South Australian Government inquiry

Hindmarsh Island Bridge Royal Commission
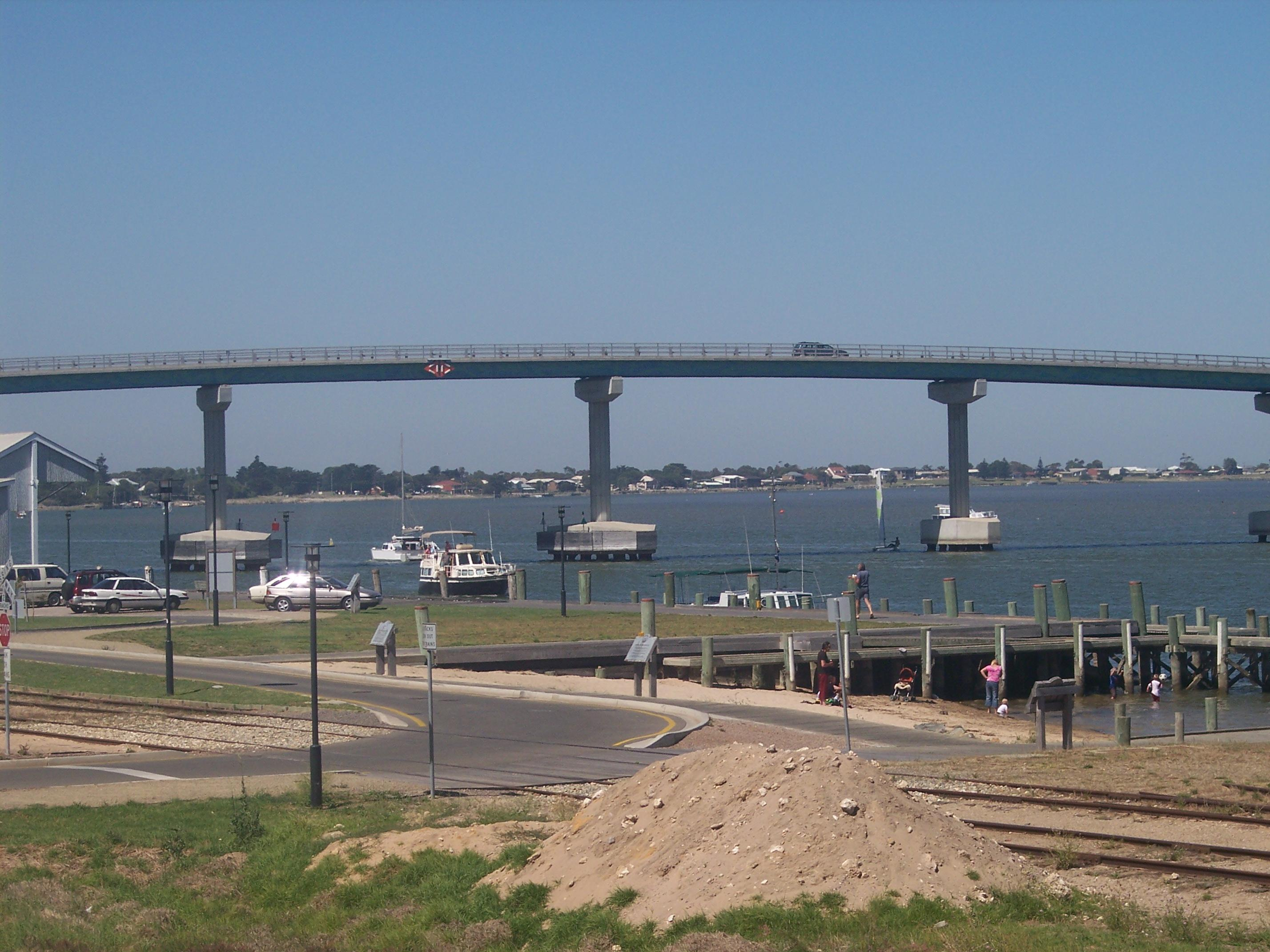
- View of the Hindmarsh Island Bridge from the Goolwa wharf
- Date: 16 June 1995 – 19 December 1995
- Duration: 6 months
- Location: South Australia, Australia
- Type: Royal commission
- Commissioner: Iris Stevens
- Counsel assisting: David Smith; Andrea Simpson
- Outcome: The claim of restricted knowledge among Ngarrindjeri women concerning the proposed bridge had been fabricated.
- Final report was presented on 19 December 1995.

The Hindmarsh Island Royal Commission was a Royal Commission into the nature of female Aboriginal religious beliefs relating to Goolwa and Hindmarsh Island in South Australia that was triggered by the Hindmarsh Island bridge controversy.

== Background ==
In May 1995, the South Australian media carried reports that the 'secret women's business' had been fabricated. Five Ngarrindjeri women reportedly said that they did not believe in or had never heard of the 'secret women's business' until it had been raised by Doreen Kartinyeri. In June 1995 there were further allegations that two prominent members of the Ngarrindjeri community – Doug and Sarah Milera – had confirmed the allegations of fabrication.

In response, the South Australian Government established a Royal Commission on 16 June 1995. A former South Australian District Court judge, Mrs Iris Stevens, was appointed as Royal Commissioner. In brief, the Royal Commissioner was appointed to inquire into and report on whether any aspect of the 'women's business' was a fabrication and, if so, how the fabrication occurred, its extent and purpose.

== Enquiry ==
Controversy plagued the work of the Royal Commission. The 'proponent women' refused to give evidence to the Commission; 'dissident' Ngarrindjeri women claimed threats and intimidation; Ngarrindjeri elder, Doug Milera reportedly withdrew his allegations that the 'secret women's business' had been fabricated; amateur historian, Betty Fisher, told the Commission she had first been told of the 'secret women's business' in 1960; and anthropologists from the South Australian Museum disputed the existence of the 'secret women's business'.

None of the dissident women were able to take their claims of fabrication further than their own lack of knowledge of the beliefs. Several admitted that they had no knowledge of any Ngarrindjerri culture or traditions at all. Some admitted that it was not unreasonable for only a limited number of women to be privy to traditional secrets. One took the position that they saw no point in living in the past even if the claims were true. The women all identified themselves as Christians and it has been suggested some saw the Dreamtime as incompatible with their own beliefs and as a pagan belief and as such, as a false belief.

It had been shown before the Commission that no anthropological work regarding the Ngarrindjeri, specifically Ronald Berndt's authoritative book A World That Was, mentioned the existence of a secret life for Ngarrindjeri women. Cultural geographer Dr Jane Jacobs argued that these publications needed to be seen as a product of their times. In the case of Berndt, we are assuming a male anthropologist walking into an Aboriginal community in the 1940s got the truth. His enquiries were likely not directed towards secrets held by female members of the tribe. Connie Roberts, who was born in 1919 and was one of the elders who had allegedly passed the "women’s business" on to Doreen Kartinyeri, was asked about talking about such things with an anthropologist: You can't. You're not supposed to talk about things like that. My parents told me, only the old people used to tell certain people.

== Findings ==
The Royal Commission's report was published in December 1995. Its major findings were:

- the "... 'women's business' emerged in response to a need of the anti-bridge lobby to provide something of sufficient cultural significance to warrant the making of a declaration by the Federal Minister";
- the 'women's business' was unknown to the twelve dissident Ngarrindjeri women who gave evidence before the Commission and who were described by the Royal Commissioner as 'credible witnesses";
- looking at "the whole of the evidence, including the history of events, the anthropological evidence and the evidence of the dissident women, ... the whole claim of the 'women's business' from its inception was a fabrication";
- the purpose of the fabrication was to obtain a declaration prohibiting the construction of the Hindmarsh Island Bridge under the Commonwealth's Aboriginal and Torres Strait Islander Heritage Protection Act 1984;
- The secret women's business was irrational because the barrages were a more intrusive barrier than a bridge could be.

== After the Royal Commission ==
The Howard Government passed the Hindmarsh Island Bridge Act (1997), which allowed construction to go ahead; and in August 2001, in a civil case in the Federal Court of Australia, Justice John von Doussa rejected claims for damages by the developers, stating that he was not satisfied that the claims of "secret women's business" had been fabricated.
