= Aborigines' Friends' Association =

Former Aboriginal organization in Australia 1858–2000

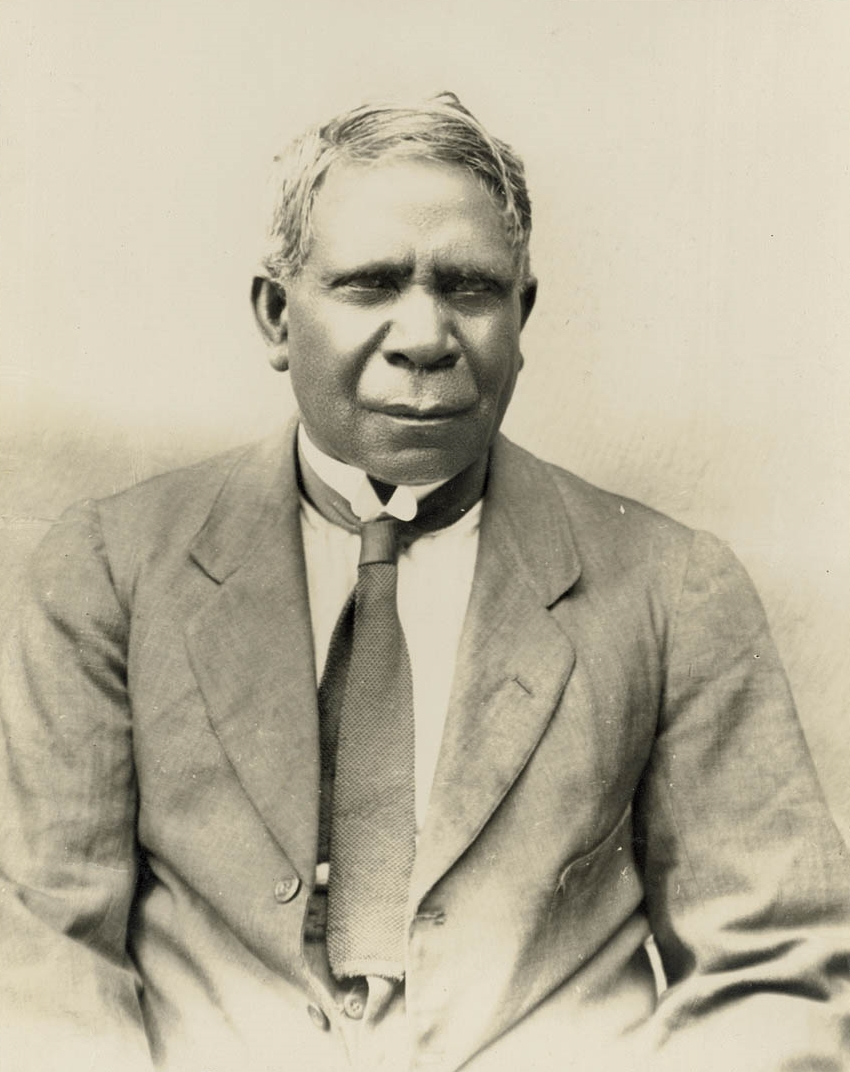
David Unaipon was a member of the Aborigines' Friends' Association

The Aborigines' Friends' Association (AFA) was established out of concern for "the moral, spiritual and physical well-being" of Australian Aboriginal people from the Northern Territory and particularly South Australia. This organisation operated for over 100 years, and had their final meeting in the year 2001.

== Foundation ==
A well-attended public meeting was held on 31 August 1858 at Green's Exchange, 65 King William Street, Adelaide, presided by the Governor, Sir Richard MacDonnell formally to found the Association. Bishop Short proposed, seconded by the businesslike (Methodist) Rev. W. Ingram "That a Society be now formed to be called the Aborigines' Friends' Association, whose object shall be the moral, spiritual, and physical well-being of the natives of this Province". The Governor accepted the invitation to act as Patron, and a committee was formed consisting of George Fife Angas (president); Bishop Short, Mr. Justice Boothby and F. S. Dutton (vice-presidents); N. Oldham and G. W. Hawkes (treasurers); C. B. Young (secretary); and William Giles, F. S. Monk, (later Sir) William Milne, Samuel Goode, James Smith, F. H. Faulding, Thomas Padman, Charles Smedley, William Peacock, George Prince, Daniel Kekwick, Captain Watts, Dr. George Mayo, Archdeacon Woodcock, Rev. C. W. Evan, Rev. R. Haining, Rev. J. Gardner, Rev. W. Ingram, Rev. J. Lyall, Rev. G. Stonehouse, Rev. A. R. Russell and Rev. R. Needham (members).

== Work ==
The Association's first project was to investigate the condition of the Aboriginal people of the Lower Murray areas, brought to a pitiable state by the appropriation of their land by European settlers. It was resolved to establish a school and training facilities in the area; George Taplin was selected as their agent to recommend a suitable location for such a mission; he chose Point McLeay, and dedicated the next twenty years of his life to making it a reality.

When in 1903 it was discovered that the city coroner, William Ramsay Smith, had removed the remains of Poltpalingada Booboorowie (Tommy Walker) before his burial in 1901, sent his body to the University of Edinburgh as an "anthropological specimen", the Association wrote to the government on behalf of the residents of Point McLeay Mission (Raukkan) asking to arrange for his remains to be returned, but their request was not taken seriously.

== Archives ==
The South Australian Museum holds extensive records relating to the Aborigines' Friends' Association. The AFA collection comprises over 800 photographic images, several annual reports, magazine clippings and related papers. The collection includes records relating to Pastor Doug Nicholls, Rev. J. H. Sexton, Rev. George Taplin, Ernest E. Kramer, David Unaipon and Albert Namatjira. This collection shows many individuals of all ages in many locations through South Australia, the Northern Territory, and other Australian locations providing an excellent visual record of the way of life in this era.

== Notable members ==
- John Lewis (Australian politician)
- Charles Burney Young
- C. N. Collison, Hon. secretary 1879–1890

== Sources ==
- Online Guide to Records at the South Australian Museum Archives
