= Raukkan, South Australia =

Raukkan
- Town
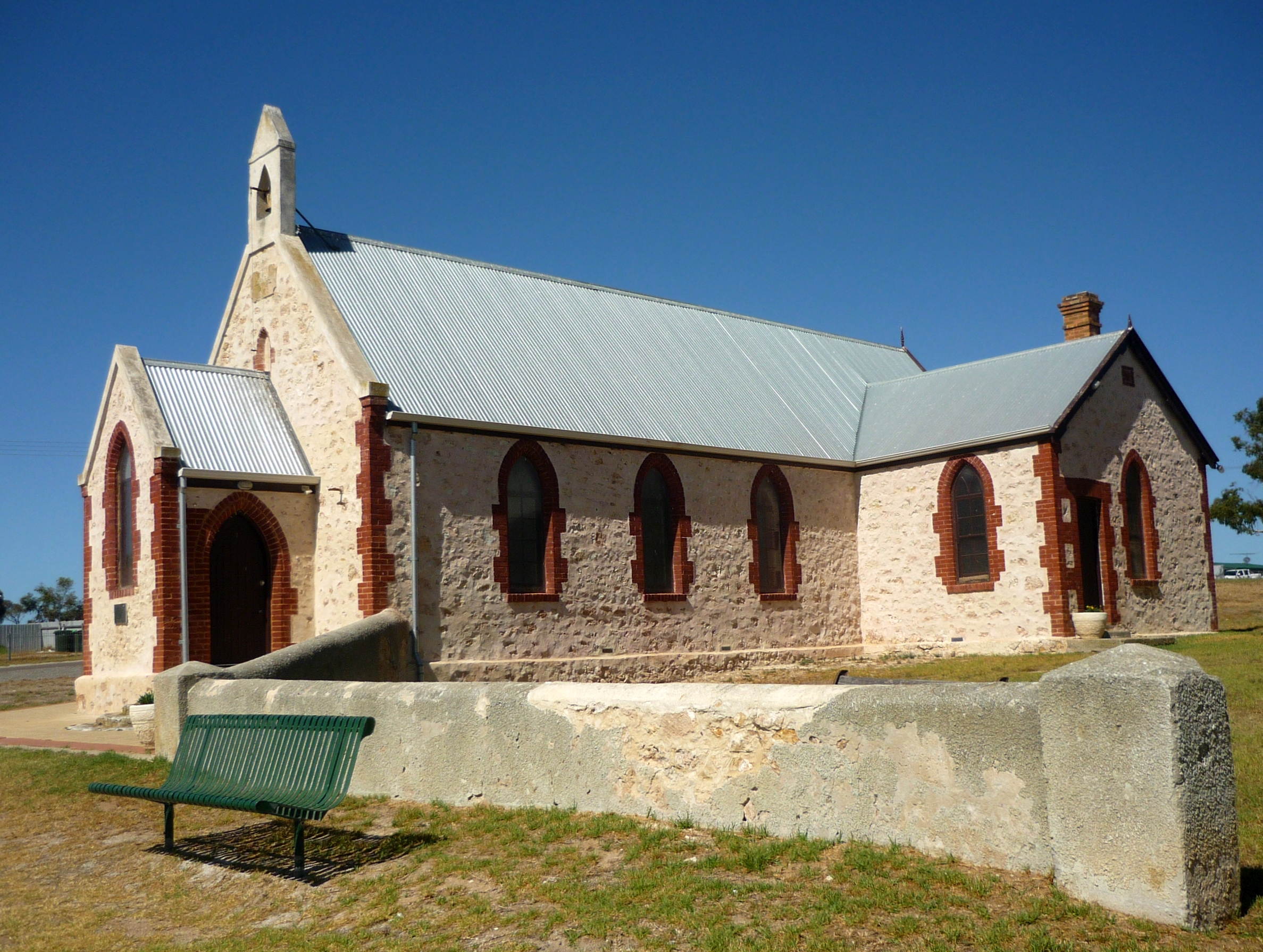
- Raukkan Church, 2015

- Coordinates: 35.506°S 139.135°E
- Country: Australia
- State: South Australia
- City: Narrung
- LGA: The Coorong District Council
- Location: 4.5 km (2.8 mi) west of Narrung; 28 km (17 mi) northwest of Meningie (across Lake Albert); 32 km (20 mi) east of Goolwa (across Lake Alexandrina)

Government
  - State electorate: MacKillop
  - Federal division: Barker

Population
  - Total: 96 (2021 census)

Raukkan is an Australian Aboriginal community situated on the south-eastern shore of Lake Alexandrina in the locality of Narrung, 80 kilometres (50 mi) southeast of the centre of South Australia's capital, Adelaide. Raukkan is "regarded as the home and heartland of Ngarrindjeri country."

It was originally established as Point McLeay mission in 1859 and became an Aboriginal reserve in 1916. It was finally handed back to the Ngarrindjeri people in 1974, and renamed Raukkan in 1982.

== History ==
Raukkan, which means "meeting place" in the Ngarrindjeri language, was for thousands of years an important meeting place for Ngarrindjeri "lakalinyeri" (clans) and the location of the Grand Tendi, the parliament of the Ngarrindjeri people. The Grand Tendi was composed of men elected from each of the eighteen lakalinyeri who then elected from its members the Rupulle or leader.

English explorer Charles Sturt first encountered the Ngarrindjeri at Raukkan, who fed the starving Sturt and his party.

In 1859 the Aborigines' Friends' Association was granted 107 hectares (260 acres) in the area and established a mission at Raukkan, which had been named "Point McLeay" by T. B. Strangways in 1837. George Taplin had selected the site, and with others such as the Rev. F. W. Cox helped build the school, church and mission station to care for the local Aboriginal people, and spent the next twenty years in that service. It was intended by the Aborigines' Friends' Association to help the Ngarrindjeri people, but could never be self-sufficient farming due to the poor quality of the soil in the area. Land clearing by farmers nearby also limited the ability for hunting, and other crafts and industries also met with difficulties due to changing environment and competition from nearby towns.

In 1896, Aboriginal men and women at Raukkan were granted the vote and voted in state and federal elections (including for the first Commonwealth Parliament in 1901) and the constitutional referendums on Australian federation. More than 100 Aboriginal people from Raukkan were listed on the South Australian electoral roll and seventy per cent of these voted at the 1896 South Australian election.

During World War I, men from Point McLeay and Point Pearce were among the first Aboriginal men in the state to enlist. 16 men from Point McLeay volunteered and four never returned — Alban Varcoe, Millar Mack, and brothers Cyril and Rufus Rigney, who were grandsons of the Rev. Philip Rigney. A memorial window in the Point McLeay church was unveiled by General S. Price Weir on 14 August 1925.

In 1916, responsibility for Raukkan moved to South Australia's Chief Protector of Aborigines and it became an Aboriginal reserve. This followed the recommendations of the South Australian Royal Commission on the Aborigines in 1913. Included in the recommendations was that the government become the guardian of all Aboriginal children upon reaching their 10th birthday, and place them "where they deem best". Seven years after the Final Report of the commission, the Aborigines (Training of Children) Act 1923, to allow Indigenous children to be "trained" in a special institution so that they could go out and work.

Since 1974, the community has been administered by the Ngarrindjeri people themselves; it was renamed Raukkan in 1982.

Raukkan Aboriginal School is in the town. In the 2021 Australian census the population was 96 persons, all of whom identified themselves as Aboriginal and Torres Strait Islander people.

== Raukkan Aboriginal School ==
The school was established in the years 1859 and 1860 by the Ngarrindjeri people and the missionary, George Taplin. It celebrated its 150th year of operation in 2010. In 2018, the school, operated by the Government of South Australia, had a total enrolment of 15 students – all Ngarrindjeri – and a teaching staff of three.

== Notable residents ==
The Mission was mentioned in the Bringing Them Home Report (1997) as an institution housing Indigenous children forcibly removed from their families, creating part of the Stolen Generations.

Raukkan was home to James Unaipon (c. 1835–1907) and his son David (1872 – 1967). James Unaipon was the first Australian Aboriginal deacon. and co-authored writings on the Ngarrindjeri language and David was a writer and inventor, who along with the Raukkan Church, is featured on the Australian fifty-dollar note.

Ivaritji (c. 1849–1929) was a Kaurna elder and the last known speaker of the Kaurna language.

"Granny" Euniapon was subject of a pastel sketch by Frederick C. Britton purchased by the Art Gallery of South Australia in 1916. (Elsewhere spelled "Unaipon".)

Harry Hewitt (c. 1861–1907) was a notable South Australian athlete who spent much of his life based at the Point McLeay mission. He would go on to play football for Medindie and Port Adelaide in a game against Fitzroy.

Roland Carter (1892–1960) was a labourer born in Raukkan and was the first Ngarrindjeri man from the Point McLeay Mission Station to enlist in the First Australian Imperial Force. He fought in World War one, was taken prisoner by the Germans and returned to live in Raukkan after being released at the end of the war.

Annie Isabel Rankine MBE (1917-1972) was the first chair of the Point McLeay community council . Leila Rankine (1932–1993) was a community worker and musician who co-founded the Centre for Aboriginal Studies in Music.

Doreen Kartinyeri (1935–2007) was a Ngarrindjeri elder and historian.

Kysaiah Pickett (born 2001) is an Australian Rules footballer and 2021 premiership player for the Melbourne Demons Football Club in the Australian Football League.

== See also ==
=== Other 19th-century Aboriginal missions in SA ===
- Killalpaninna
- Koonibba
- Point Pearce
- Poonindie

== Sources ==
- Gale, M. (1997) Dhanum Djorra'wuy Dhawu, Aboriginal Research Institute, Underdale. ISBN 0-86803-182-8.
- Horton, D. (1994) The Encyclopaedia of Aboriginal Australia : Aboriginal and Torres Strait Islander history, society and culture; Vol. 2 M-Z, Australian Institute of Aboriginal and Torres Strait Islander Studies: Canberra. ISBN 0855752505.
- Jenkin, G. (1979) Conquest of the Ngarrindjeri, Rigby: Adelaide. ISBN 0-7270-1112-X.
- Raukkan Community Council (2009) Historic Raukkan, Home of the Ngarrindjeri, Raukkan Community Council: Raukkan.
- Whitehorn, Zane "Raukkan community: Pride of the Ngarrindjeri nation", Indigenous Newslines, March–May 2010.
