= David Unaipon =

Aboriginal Australian writer (1872–1967)

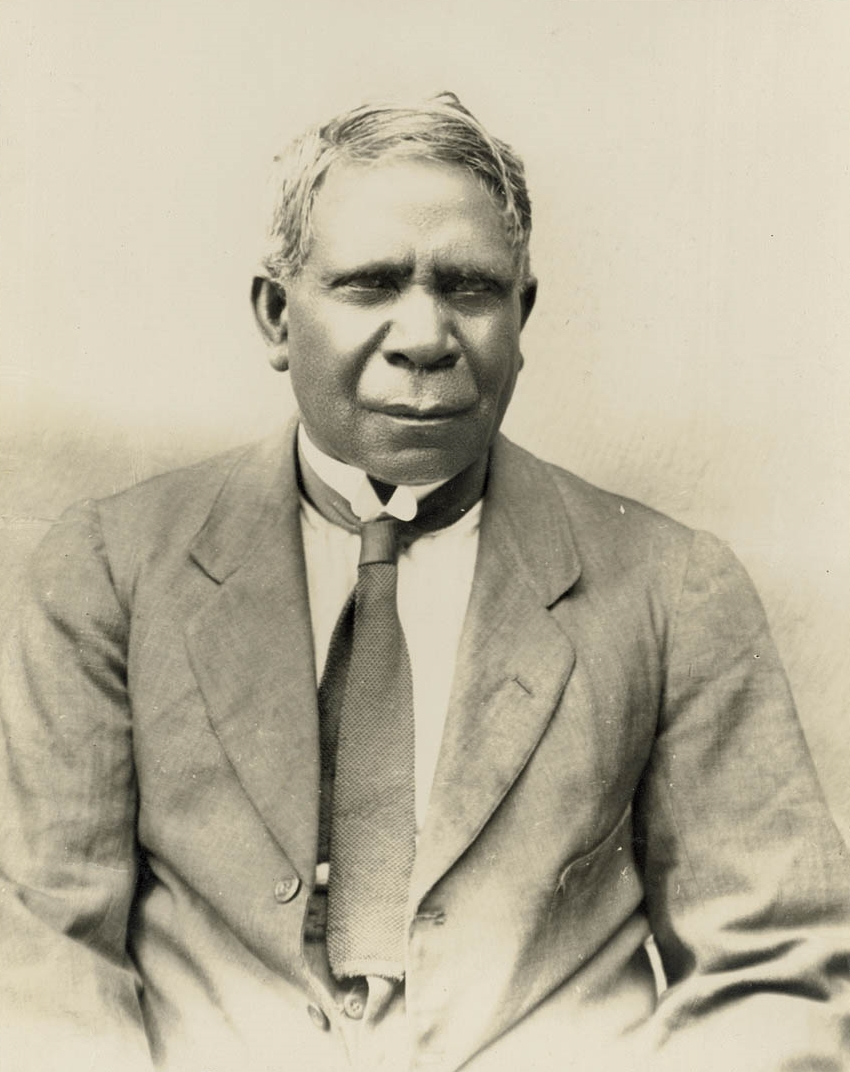
- Unaipon in the late 1920s
- Born: David Ngunaitponi; 28 September 1872; Point McLeay Mission, South Australia
- Died: 7 February 1967 (aged 94); Tailem Bend, South Australia

David Unaipon (28 September 1872 – 7 February 1967) was an Aboriginal Australian author, inventor, and preacher. Born at the Point McLeay Mission in South Australia, he was the son of the Ngarrindjeri preacher James Ngunaitponi and his wife, Nymbulda. Unaipon became a well-known public speaker and spent much of his life touring Australia to speak at schools and churches about Aboriginal culture. He was also an inventor and registered 10 patents between 1909 and 1944.

Unaipon authored a large body of essays and stories, many based on oral traditions that he had gathered from Aboriginal communities across Australia. He published his writing in newspapers and in pamphlets that he sold to fund his speaking tours. In 1925 he authored a book-length manuscript titled Legendary Tales of the Australian Aborigines. Unaipon sold the copyright for the manuscript to the publisher Angus & Robertson, which led to its appropriation by the anthropologist William Ramsay Smith. The manuscript was published in 1930 under Ramsay Smith's name with no mention of Unaipon's authorship; it was not until 2001 that it was first published under Unaipon's name.

During the late 1920s Unaipon was regarded as one of the best-known Aboriginal people in Australia and was often called upon by the Australian government to act as the sole spokesperson for the country's Indigenous population. A devout Christian and strong advocate for missionary efforts, Unaipon was a supporter of assimilationist policies and clashed with more progressive Aboriginal activists in his later life. Since 1995 Unaipon has featured on the Australian $50 note.

== Life ==
=== Early life ===
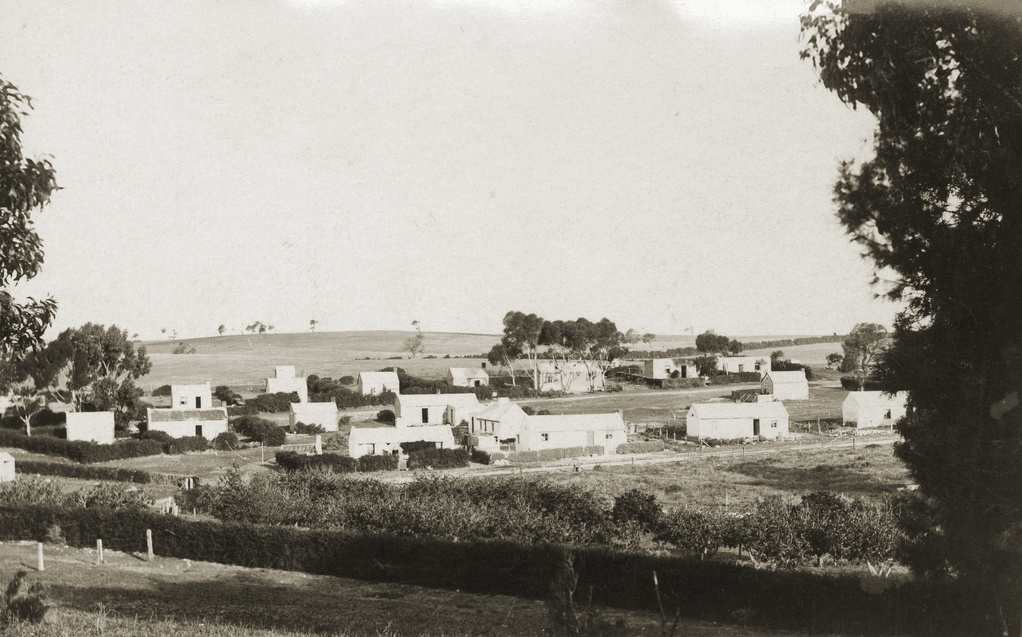
The Point McLeay Mission, Unaipon's birthplace

David Unaipon was born on 28 September 1872 at the Point McLeay Mission in South Australia. He was a member of the Ngarrindjeri people, an Aboriginal nation comprising eighteen tribes residing in the lower Murray River region. By the time of his birth, the Ngarrindjeri had been decimated by disease and displaced from their land. The Ngarrindjeri population, which had been estimated at 8,000 in 1834, had been reduced to just 2,000 by 1860. The Point McLeay Mission had been established in 1860 by the Aborigines' Friends Association (AFA), an interdenominational Christian missionary group, with the goal of converting the surviving Ngarrindjeri to Christianity and training them for domestic labour.

Unaipon was the son of James Ngunaitponi and his wife Nymbulda, the daughter of the senior man of the Karatindjeri clan. James Ngunaitponi had arrived at the Point McLeay Mission in 1864 and was the first Aboriginal man at the mission to convert to Christianity. He became a Congregational lay preacher and worked with the mission's superintendent to produce books on the Ngarrindjeri's culture and language. He spent time as a travelling evangelist, urging his fellow Ngarrindjeri to abandon practices that he viewed as incompatible with Christianity; Unaipon later described his father as "a good liaison officer between the white and black races" and as someone who "used his influence to persuade others to accept the gospel". Unaipon was the fourth of his parents' nine children.

From a young age, Unaipon was regarded as an intelligent child with strong academic potential, particularly due to his status as the son of the mission's first Aboriginal convert to Christianity. At the age of seven he began attending the mission school, and at thirteen he was sent to Adelaide to work as a servant for the secretary of the AFA, the farmer and winemaker Charles Burney Young. Young encouraged Unaipon's interest in music, science, and philosophy, while Young's wife taught him to play the piano. Unaipon returned to the mission in 1890, where he continued to read widely, learned Latin and Greek, and trained as a bootmaker. He also pursued his interest in music and was eventually selected as the mission's church organist.

Unaipon began working for a bootmaker in Adelaide in the late 1890s, then returned to the mission to begin working as a bookkeeper at the mission store. He married Katherine Carter (née Sumner), a Tangani woman who was employed as a servant, on 4 January 1902; they had one son, Talmage de Witt, later that year. According to Unaipon's later writing, around this time he became restless at the lack of opportunities available to him on the mission and developed a fascination with perpetual motion after hearing a lecture by a visiting scientist.

=== Career ===
In 1909 Unaipon accompanied the mission's Glee Club on a tour of Adelaide, where he spoke to audiences about Indigenous knowledge of astronomy and botany, as well as Ngarrindjeri traditions and folklore. He began to predict scientific advances, leading him to be labelled in the press as "Australia's Leonardo" and a "black genius". That year, he registered a patent for a new sheep-shearing mechanism, and in 1914 he predicted that an aeroplane could be developed based on the same aerodynamic principles as a boomerang.

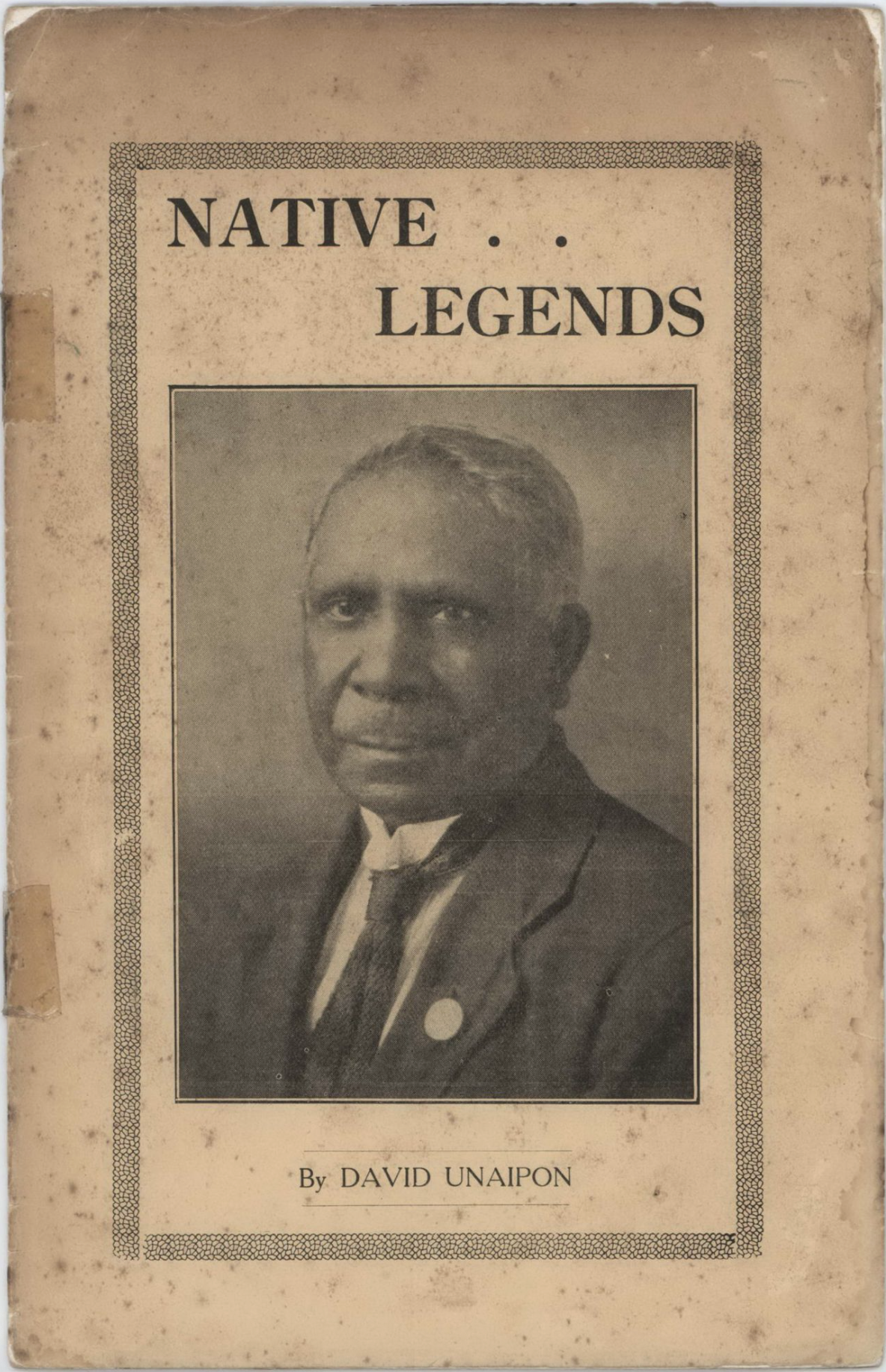
Cover of David Unaipon's 1929 pamphlet Native Legends

From 1913 Unaipon was employed by the AFA as a subscription collector, which allowed him to travel the country and develop connections with prominent settlers. The relationships that he forged with white Australians through the AFA allowed him to retain effective freedom of movement, which was uncommon for Aboriginal people at the time. He travelled across southern Australia throughout the 1920s to speak at churches and schools about Aboriginal traditions and the treatment of the Aboriginal population.

Unaipon published his first piece of writing in August 1924: an article in the Daily Telegraph titled "Aboriginals: Their Traditions and Customs. Where Did They Come From?". He continued to be a regular writer for the newspaper in the years that followed. That year he was the subject of a watercolour portrait by Benjamin Edwin Minns in which he was described as a "Scientist Lecturer". In February 1925 he published his first mythological tale, titled "The Story of the Mungingee", in the magazine The Home. He spent much of his time studying at the South Australian Museum, where he read widely about anthropology, the classics, and the ancient world. The museum's committee approved a motion to hire him as an attendant in 1925, but funding for his appointment was never secured. The following year, while earning his living as a freelance writer, Unaipon returned to the Point McLeay Mission to care for his mother. While he was there, he was arrested and fined for vagrancy after the superintendent determined that he was not making adequate efforts to seek regular employment.

Unaipon continued to publish articles and poetry in newspapers and magazines over the following decades, many of which he drew from stories and legends that he had collected from Aboriginal communities across Australia. In 1925 he sold 29 of his articles, including legends and essays on Aboriginal ethnography, to the publisher Angus and Robertson for £167 5s (equivalent to $15,411 in 2022). He published several booklets of Aboriginal folklore, including Hungarrda in 1927 and Kinie Ger—The Native Cat in 1928, with support from the AFA. He continued to deliver sermons and lectures across Australia, funding his travels through the sale of these pamphlets and through donations from his supporters. In 1929 he published Native Legends, a 15-page booklet of Aboriginal stories. In 1938 it was reported that Unaipon had sold 20,000–25,000 copies of his pamphlets over the preceding five years.

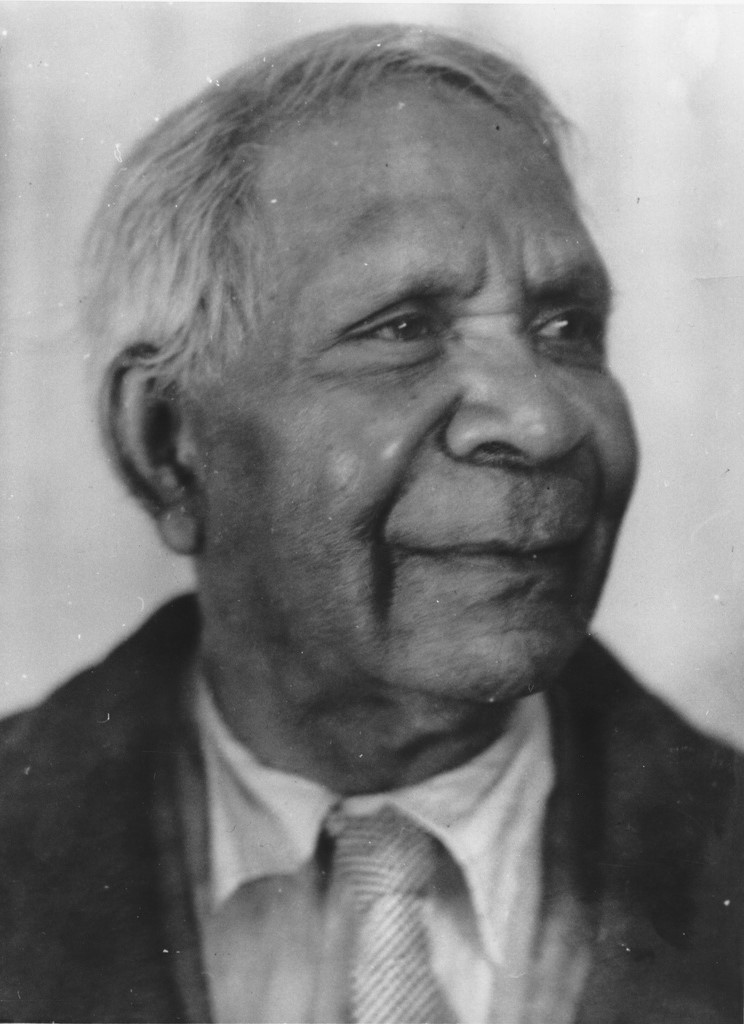
David Unaipon pictured in the 1930s

Unaipon was regarded as an Aboriginal spokesperson by settler authorities and was frequently invited to address government inquiries, sometimes as the sole representative of the Aboriginal population. After a proposal for the establishment of a model "Black State" in central and northern Australia was introduced to parliament in 1925, Unaipon became an advocate for the proposal and was discussed as its potential first president. In 1926 he addressed a royal commission into the treatment of Aboriginal Australians, and in 1928 he assisted John William Bleakley, the Queensland Chief Protector of Aborigines, in conducting an inquiry into the treatment of Aboriginal people in the Northern Territory. By the late 1920s, Unaipon was regarded as one of the most prominent Aboriginal people in the country. He eventually became a strong supporter of policies of assimilation and urged the federal government to take on a more active role in Aboriginal affairs. Unaipon was often presented as an example of the benefits of assimilation policies; he himself said that his success demonstrated what Aboriginal people could achieve if they were raised in a Christian environment from a young age.

Unaipon's political influence declined in the 1930s amidst the emergence of a more progressive and reformist Aboriginal rights movement. The Aborigines Progressive Association, founded by William Ferguson and Jack Patten in 1934, staged a protest in 1938 that they termed the "Day of Mourning". Unaipon boycotted the event and was critical of their activism, writing in a letter released by the Department of the Interior that he "[deplored] the emotional tone of the Day of Mourning as much as the political motives behind it". He later wrote that he saw no means for Aboriginal advancement apart from "co-operation between the white and black races". Unaipon was a strong advocate for missionary efforts; he wrote that the best hope for Aboriginal Australians lay in "properly-conducted missionary enterprise" that would "[give] them the inner power to reconstruct their lives which have become shattered by contact with white civilisation".

=== Later life and death ===
Unaipon continued writing until at least 1959; he published short autobiographical pamphlets titled My Life Story in 1951 and Leaves of Memory in 1953, as well as a number of poems written in his later life. In 1953 Unaipon was awarded a Coronation Medal. He continued working as a travelling preacher into his eighties before retiring to Point McLeay to continue his lifelong research into perpetual motion and to work on his inventions. He died at Tailem Bend on 7 February 1967 and was buried at the Point McLeay Mission.

== Writing ==
=== Myths and Legends of the Australian Aboriginals ===
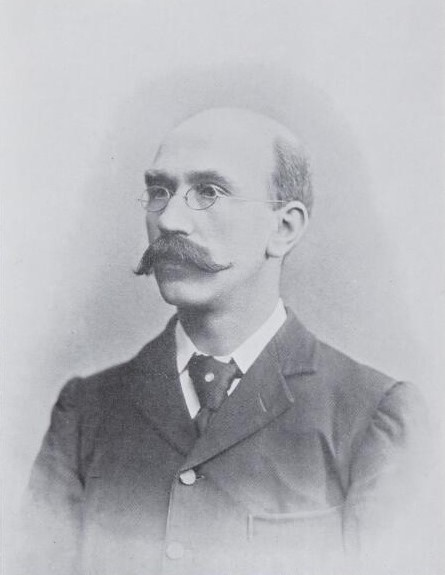
William Ramsay Smith, who published Unaipon's manuscript under his own name

By 1925, Unaipon had produced a book-length manuscript that he titled Legendary Tales of the Australian Aborigines. The collection of 29 pieces included tales based on Aboriginal mythology, such as "Why Frogs Jump into the Water" and "The Water Rat who Discovered the Secret of Fire", as well as essays on Aboriginal customs and practices, including "Marriage Customs of the Australian Aborigines", "Fishing", "Hunting", and "Sport". He sold each of the pieces in the collection, including the associated copyright, to the publisher Angus & Robertson between January and July of that year.

Later that year, the anthropologist William Ramsay Smith wrote to George Robertson of Angus & Robertson after being commissioned by the publisher Harrap to contribute a book on Aboriginal Australian mythology to the publisher's "Myths and Legends" series. He asked Robertson whether he was aware of any materials on Aboriginal myths, and Robertson replied that they were intending to publish a book on Aboriginal mythology written by Unaipon. After missing a letter from the publisher, Unaipon concluded that they were no longer interested in publishing his manuscript and set out on a long journey, causing the project to stall. After hearing nothing from Unaipon for a year, Angus & Robertson sold the copyright to his writing to Ramsay Smith.

Unaipon's largely handwritten manuscript was sent to Ramsay Smith from January 1927. Ramsay Smith edited Unaipon's stories to convert their familiar style of prose into a more scientific and detached voice. The book was published by Harrap in 1930 under the title Myths & Legends of the Australian Aboriginals, credited to Ramsay Smith, with no mention of Unaipon. The edition was illustrated with watercolours by Alice Woodward as well as photographs and illustrations of various Australian places and Aboriginal artefacts. Ramsay Smith's version of the collection saw several reprintings; it was first published in the United States in the 1930s and continued to be reprinted until 1970. Some of the stories were included in an edition published in Japan in 1985, and Random House published a paperback version of the Ramsay Smith edition in the late 1990s.

Unaipon's original manuscript was placed in the collection of the State Library of New South Wales after his death. In 2001 a new edition of Myths and Legends of the Australian Aboriginals was published under Unaipon's name and original title, edited by the scholars Adam Shoemaker and Stephen Muecke in consultation with representatives of Unaipon's estate.

=== Themes and style ===
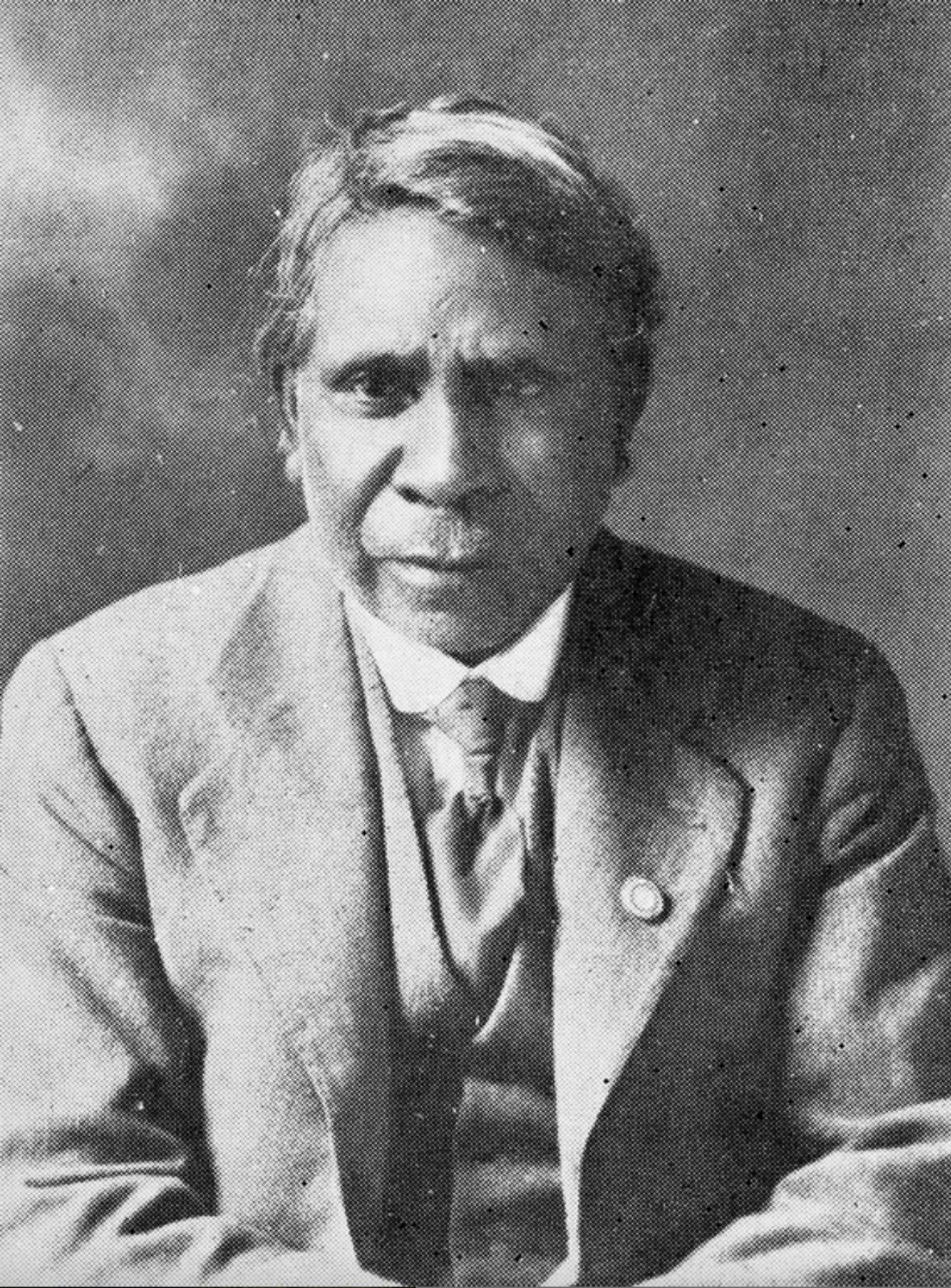
David Unaipon pictured in the 1920s

Unaipon's writing spanned a range of genres, including ethnographic writing about Aboriginal Australian culture and essays about Aboriginal spirituality. According to Shoemaker, Unaipon's writing consisted of four distinct types of narrative: the historical/mythological tale, the Christian/Aboriginal spiritual parable, the practical/anthropological text, and the fairy tale/fable. Shoemaker and Muecke describe his writing as "eclectic", noting that he drew on mythology from across Australia, as well as Christian narratives, fairy tales, and Indigenous oral tradition. They add that his writing displays an "elaborate and ornate style" reminiscent of that used in sermons. To the academic Matthew Rimmer, Unaipon's gathering of mythological tales from Aboriginal communities across Australia lends his writing a "striking sense of collective authorship".

Unaipon's writing was heavily influenced by his Christian beliefs and often explored the similarities between Aboriginal culture and Christianity. He also wrote about the universality of various customs and practices across religions and cultures. The researcher John Alexander likens Unaipon to a scientist who studied European culture to better understand how it related to his own. Alexander writes that Unaipon displayed a pride in his Aboriginal culture and attempted to show that things he associated with civilisation—such as science, law, and belief in a divine power—were present in Aboriginal traditions. Unaipon wrote in one piece that Aboriginal Australians were the most skilled hunters among what he termed the "primitive races", and that their hunting and fishing skill demonstrated their scientific and mathematical abilities. The literary scholar Sue Hosking describes Unaipon's writing as emerging from the contact zone between Aboriginal traditions and settler society, writing that Unaipon expressed both gratitude for what he viewed as the civilising influence of European colonisation, and bitterness towards Europeans for the disruption and oppression that their arrival had brought. The historian Hilary Carey suggests that his primary cause was to be an "evangelist for the twin causes of his Christian faith and Aboriginal race".

Unaipon's writing drew on a range of mythological traditions and oral storytelling from Aboriginal communities across the country. In comparing Unaipon's writing with other accounts of Aboriginal mythology, Carey writes that he altered myths to accord with Christian beliefs and to strip out their supernatural elements, constructing a "Great Spirit" figure in Aboriginal mythology that would demonstrate its compatibility with Christianity. Contemporary anthropologists suggested that Unaipon's writing diverged significantly from other records of Ngarrindjeri mythology. Shoemaker argues that Unaipon did not have a great deal of familiarity with Aboriginal traditions and that his writing was instead shaped by Christian and European perspectives. To Shoemaker, Unaipon's writing presents Aboriginal mythology as "proto-Christian"—as having significance and meaning, but as a primitive form of the enlightenment brought by Christianity. He describes this combination of Christian and Aboriginal narratives as "[bordering] upon the schizophrenic", labelling Unaipon's writing "uneven, inconsistent, and frequently fraught with tension between the Aboriginal and white Christian worlds".

== Inventions ==
Unaipon's patent designs for an improved sheep-shearing mechanism

Between 1909 and 1944, Unaipon registered ten provisional patents for his inventions with pro bono assistance from the lawyer J. Herbert Cooke. His first invention was a modified design for sheep shears that converted rotary to straight-line movement, helping to reduce mechanical seizing and allow for the shearing of finer types of wool. The extent to which Unaipon's sheep-shearing mechanism was employed by shearers is unknown; the design was used by the firm Moffat-Virtue, but the terms under which the patent was used are not clear. A similar mechanism patented at around the same time in the United States became more widely employed.

Unaipon's second invention was an engine that he co-developed with a man named F. Russell in 1913. He was unsuccessful in persuading the AFA to financially support the development of the technology, and the patent ultimately lapsed. He was likewise unsuccessful in gaining the AFA's support for his 1915 patent for a mechanism for lifting heavy objects. Unaipon's other inventions included a propulsion device and a centrifugal motor; he also conducted research into light polarisation and ballistics. Unaipon was unable to commercialise any of his inventions, and each of his patents eventually lapsed. He often demonstrated his inventions and delivered lectures on Aboriginal scientific knowledge to tourists and officials who visited the Point McLeay Mission.

== Legacy ==
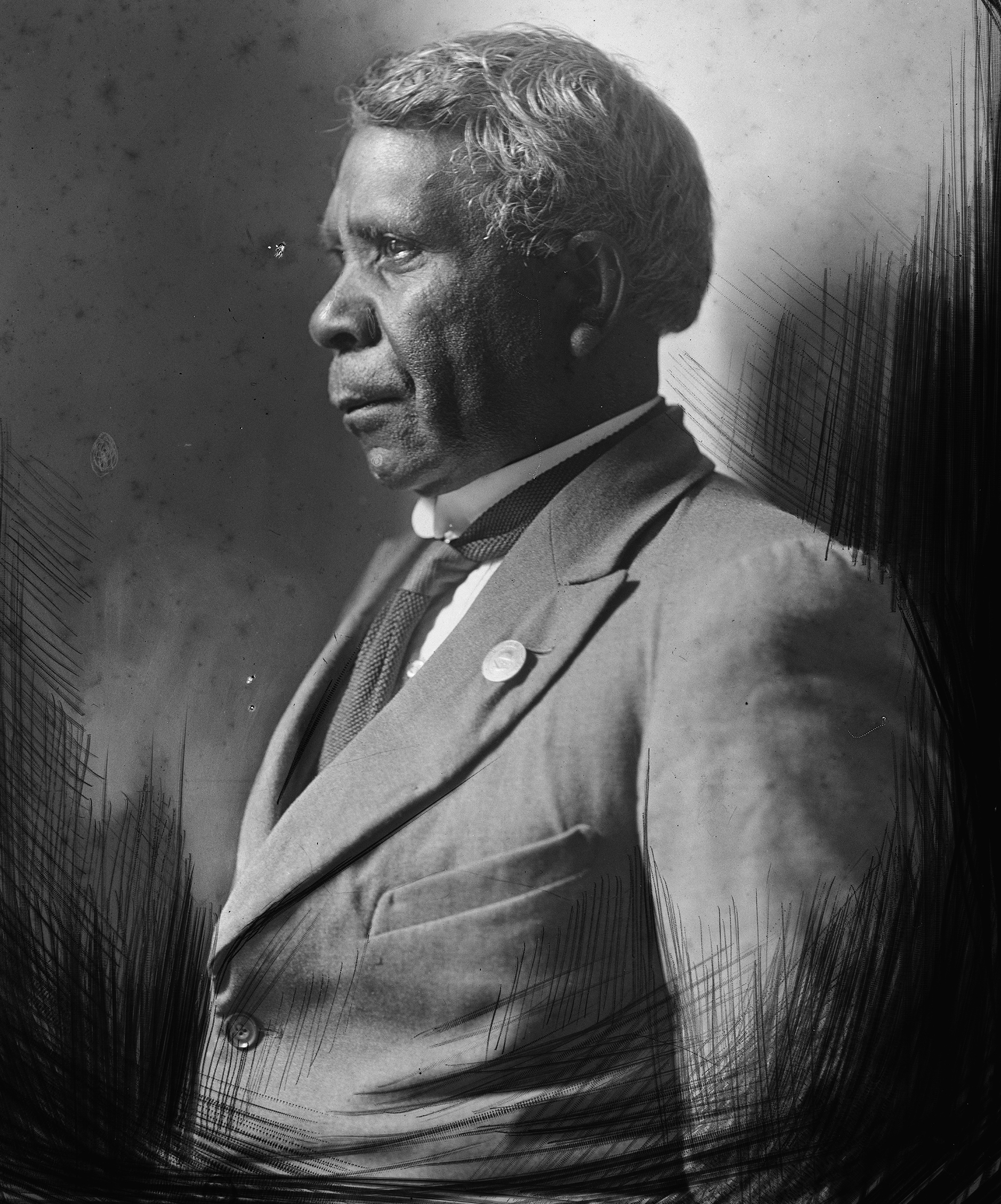
David Unaipon, photographed by Harold Cazneaux

During his lifetime, Unaipon was best known as an inventor and public speaker and was often labelled in the press as "the Australian Da Vinci" and "Black Leonardo". While his writing was not widely appreciated until after his death, he has since been described as Australia's first published Aboriginal author; it was not until the 1960s that the next Aboriginal writer had their work commercially published. The David Unaipon Award was established in 1988 by the University of Queensland Press for unpublished Indigenous writers. It was transferred to the Queensland Premier's Literary Awards in 1999 and is now part of the Queensland Literary Awards.

In 1995 Unaipon was chosen to appear on the Australian $50 note, becoming the first named Indigenous figure to feature on an Australian banknote. Along with a portrait of Unaipon, the design of the note features the shields of the Ngarrindjeri and the designs of Unaipon's sheep-shearing mechanism. The banknote also contains a quote from the preface to Myths and Legends of the Australian Aboriginals: "As a full-blooded member of my race I think I may claim to be the first—but I hope, not the last—to produce an enduring record of our customs, beliefs and imaginings."

Unaipon's legacy has long been debated by scholars. The academic John Beston argued in 1979 that Unaipon was "by no means a white man's puppet". Shoemaker critiqued Beston's assessment, arguing that Unaipon presented himself as "something akin to a self-professed black prophet or seer" who had learned the customs of white society and would bring them to his fellow Aboriginal Australians. He argued that Unaipon was "so fully indoctrinated" by the AFA that his Christian worldview overshadowed his connection to Aboriginal traditions. Alexander described him as "the star pupil of a paternalistic mission culture" whose achievements "sit uneasily within current Aboriginal aspirations for self-determination". Hosking writes that the portrayal of Unaipon as a white man's puppet fails to do justice to his intelligence and his aspirations for a society inclusive of Australians of all races. The literary historian Benjamin Miller suggests that Unaipon's legacy is fraught with contradiction, pointing out the tension between Unaipon's defences of Aboriginal rights and his complicity with colonial practices of appropriation and forced assimilation.
