= Graham Jenkin =

Australian poet, historian, composer and educator

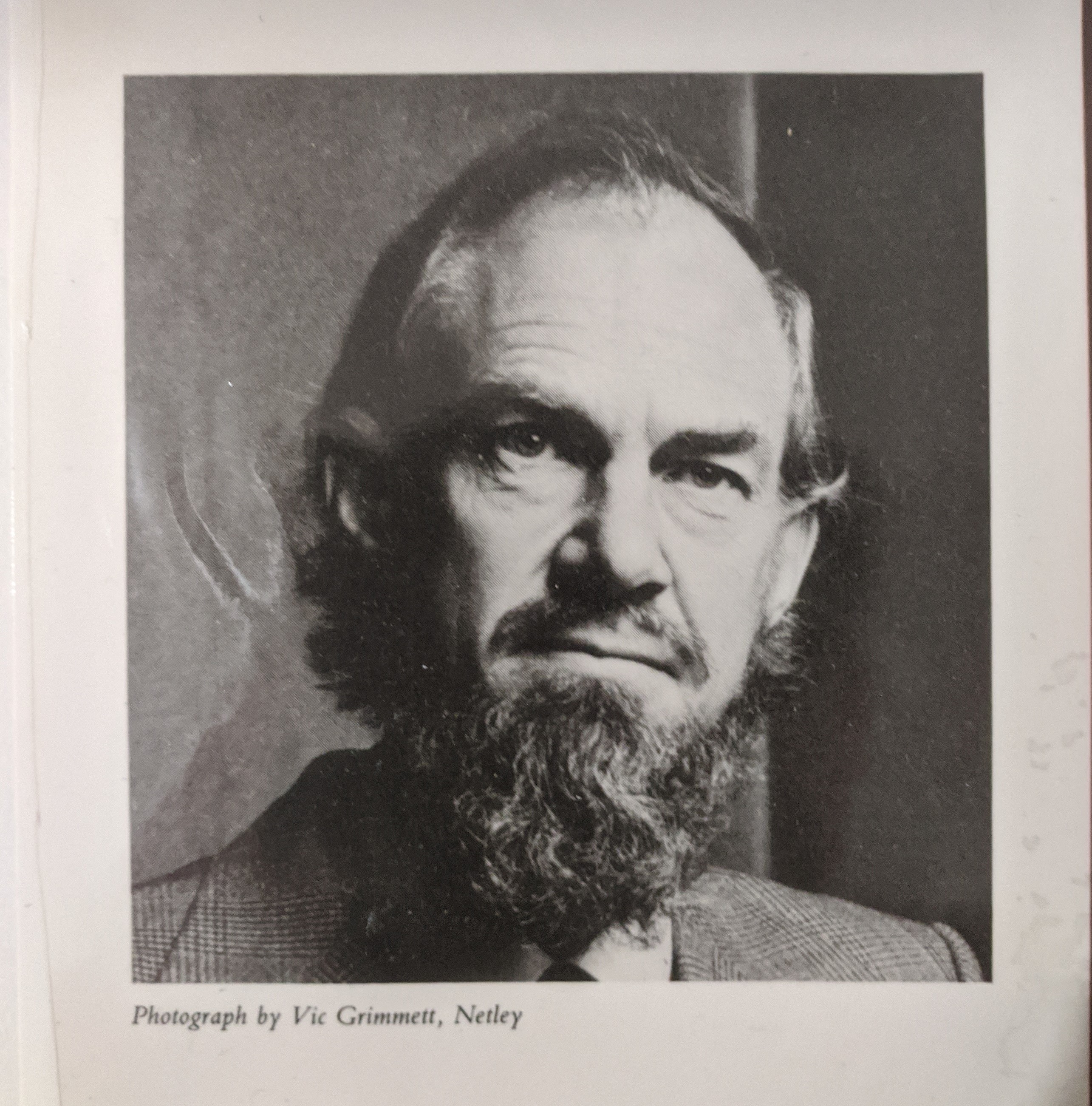
- Born: Graham Keith Jenkin; 17 May 1938 (age 88); Adelaide, South Australia
- Occupations: Historian, poet, writer, composer
- Writing career
- Notable works: Conquest of the Ngarrindjeri, Ballad of the Blue Lake Bunyip, The Fencers Yarn
- Notable awards: 1978 SA Biennial Literature Prize, 1979 Wilke Award for Australian non-fiction

Graham Jenkin (born Graham Keith Jenkin, 17 May 1938) is an Australian poet, historian, composer, and educator.

== Background ==
Jenkin was born in Adelaide and educated at various country schools and at Prince Alfred College, Wattle Park Teachers College, and the University of Adelaide, from where he received a Master of Arts. His thesis later became the basis of his 1979 book Conquest of the Ngarrindjeri. He received a PhD from the University of South Australia. Jenkin spent two years working as a jackeroo on stations in northern South Australia. In 1961, he founded the Tea and Damper Club, which was devoted to the preservation of Australian folklore, music and poetry.

== Career ==
=== Education ===
From 1963 to 1965, he was head teacher of Coober Pedy Primary School.

In 1966, Jenkin was appointed as a lecturer at Wattle Park Teachers College and then its successor institution the University of South Australia.

=== Musical ===
In 1968 Jenkin, together with his wife Robyn Jenkin, Tony Strutton and Brenton Tregloan, formed The Overlanders, a group which performed bush songs and bush ballads. The Overlanders produced records, including Songs of the Breaker (1980) and Songs of the Great Australian Balladists (1978). The albums Songs of the Great Australian Balladists (cat. EMS TV 7152) and Tribute to Western Australia 150 (cat. EMS 7155) were released on Graham Morphett's EMS Records label that was based in Adelaide.

=== Other activities ===
In 1996, Graham Jenkin was awarded the title of National Non-Indigenous Person of the Year, by the National Aboriginal and Islander Day Observance Committee (NAIDOC), for services to Aboriginal history.

== Works ==
- Favourite Australian bush songs, (with Lionel Long), Adelaide, Rigby, 1964
- Two years on Bardunyah Station, Adelaide, Pitjantjara, 1967
- The famous race for Wombat's lace, Adelaide, Rigby, 1977
- Songs of the great Australian Balladists, Adelaide, Rigby, 1978; second edition published in 1983 by the Education Department of South Australia
- Conquest of the Ngarrindjeri, Adelaide, Rigby, 1979; winner, 1978 SA Biennial Literature Prize Winner, 1979 Wilke Award for Australian non-fiction
- Songs of the Breaker, Adelaide, Book Agencies, 1980
- The head teacher, Adelaide, Education Department of SA, 1980
- Convict times, (jointly), Adelaide, Omnibus, 1981
- The ballad of the Blue Lake bunyip, Adelaide, Omnibus, 1982
- Calling me home, Adelaide, SACAE, 1989
- The Bardunyah ballads, Sydney, Simtrak, 1992
- Meralte: the boat, Adelaide, JB Publishing, 2003
- The songs from Meralte, Adelaide, JB Publishing, 2003
