= British colonisation of South Australia =

Establishment of the colony, 1829–1842

Province of South Australia Provinz Südaustralien (Barossa German)
- 1836–1901
- Flag (1876–1904) Coat of Arms
- Status: British colony
- Capital: Adelaide
- Common languages: South Australian English, Barossa German
- Government: Limited Self-Governing Province (1836–1842), Crown colony (1842–1856), Fully Self-Governing Province (1857-1901)
- Monarch
  - 1834–1837: William IV first
  - 1837–1901: Victoria last
- Governor
  - 1836–1838: John Hindmarsh first
  - 1899–1901: Hallam Tennyson last
- Legislature: Parliament of South Australia
  - Upper house: Legislative Council (1836-1901)
  - Lower house: House of Assembly (1857-1901)
- History
  - Independence from the Colony of New South Wales: 1836
  - Federation of Australia: 1901
| Preceded by | Succeeded by |
| Colony of New South Wales | South Australia |

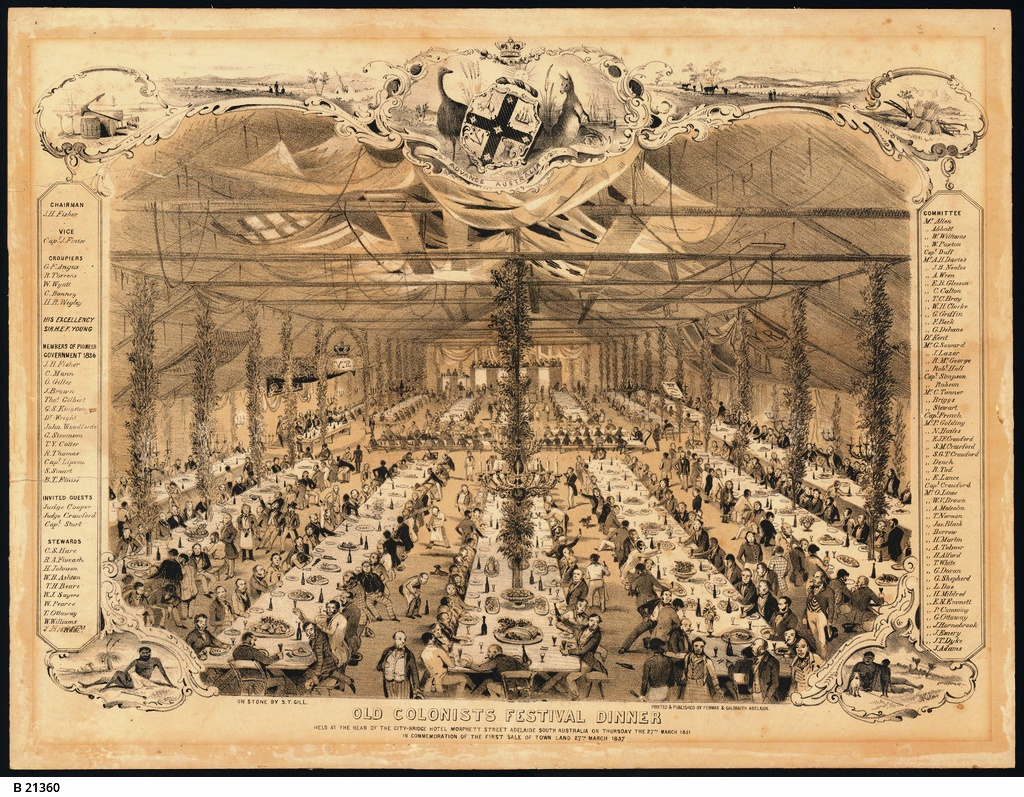
"Old Colonists" Festival Dinner on 27 March 1851, in commemoration of the first sale of town land on 27 March 1837. Members of the 1836 government are listed alongside.

British colonisation of South Australia describes the planning and establishment of the colony of South Australia by the British government, covering the period from 1829, when the idea was raised by the then-imprisoned Edward Gibbon Wakefield, to 1842, when the South Australia Act 1842 changed the form of government to a Crown colony.

Ideas espoused and promulgated by Wakefield since 1829 led to the formation of the South Australian Land Company in 1831, but this first attempt failed to achieve its goals, and the company folded.

The South Australian Association was formed in 1833 by Wakefield, Robert Gouger and other supporters, which put forward a proposal less radical than previous ones, which was finally supported and a Bill proposed in Parliament.

The British Province of South Australia was established by the South Australia Act 1834 in August 1834, and the South Australian Company formed on 9 October 1835 to fulfil the purposes of the act by forming a new colony financed by land sales. The first settlers arrived on Kangaroo Island in July 1836, with all of the ships later sailing north soon afterwards to anchor in Holdfast Bay on the advice of Surveyor-General, Colonel William Light. The foundation of South Australia is usually considered to be the proclamation of the new Province by Governor Hindmarsh at Glenelg on 28 December 1836.

However, after the government under the Colonisation Commission set up by the 1834 Act failed to achieve financial self-sufficiency, the South Australia Act 1842 repealed the earlier Act, made South Australia a Crown colony, provided for the formation of an appointed Legislative Assembly and passed greater powers to the Governor of South Australia (then Sir George Grey).

There were moves towards representative self-government in the mid-nineteenth century, and South Australia became a self-governing colony in October 1856.

== Background ==
The French Nicolas Baudin and the British Matthew Flinders had both made exploratory voyages along the central southern coastline. On 8 April 1802, the vessels of the two explorers met off South Australia, at what is now called Encounter Bay. They each gave names to various places around Kangaroo Island and the two gulfs: Gulf St Vincent and Spencer Gulf. The British Government, not wanting to be pre-empted by the French, sent out expeditions to Port Phillip and northern Tasmania, and set up the first free settlement, the Swan River Colony, in 1829.

Historian Geoffrey Dutton suggests three clear phases in the foundation of the colony: first, the practical men, with their discoveries, second, the theorists, in particular Wakefield and Gouger, who had not seen Australia, and, lastly, the settlers, who had to marry fact with ideals.

=== Previous European settlement ===
Prior to the establishment of a formal British colony, Kangaroo Island was inhabited by sealers more or less continuously from 1803, when American sealing captain Isaac Pendleton established an outpost at what was named American River. The island soon became a target for sealers based in the British colonies of New South Wales and Van Diemen's Land.

In 1826, The Australian estimated that Kangaroo Island had a population of around 200 people, who in addition to sealing also traded in salt and wallaby and kangaroo skins. However, following the decline of the sealing industry, the island's population had dwindled significantly by 1836. Several farms were established at Three Well Rivers, with poultry and pigs being reared and barley, wheat and vegetables under cultivation. Many residents lived with Aboriginal women – either from mainland South Australia or Aboriginal Tasmanians from the sealing colonies on Bass Strait – who were often violently abducted from their homelands and made to work as slaves.

== 1829–1831 ==
=== Wakefield ===
Influenced by prison reformer Elizabeth Fry serving a term in prison for abducting a minor, Wakefield turned his mind to social problems caused by over-population. In 1829, he wrote a series of anonymous "Letters from Sydney" to a London newspaper, The Morning Chronicle, in which he purported to write about his own experiences as a gentleman settler in New South Wales (completely fictitious), outlining his various ideas as a new theory of colonisation. He proposed an "Emigration Fund" payable by landlords' taxes and land sales, which would fund labour for the colonies. Gouger, an enthusiastic supporter, edited the letters and published them as a book, helping to distribute Wakefield's document.

Wakefield saw the colonies as "extensions of an old society"; all classes would be represented among the settlers. In addition, the colonies would be more or less self-governing. His ideas were not original, but Wakefield was the one who synthesised a number of theories into one plan of systematic colonisation, and who spread the ideas among the British public and urged the Colonial Office to push forward with such a plan. After his release from prison in 1830, he funded the National Colonization Society, with Gouger as secretary and a large number of enthusiastic members. Wakefield's ideas caused much debate in Parliament.

After Charles Sturt discovered the River Murray in 1830, more interest in Wakefield's scheme followed. One key component of the Wakefield Scheme was that the land price should be set high enough to prevent land speculation. In 1831 a "Proposal to His Majesty's Government for founding a colony on the Southern Coast of Australia" was prepared under the auspices of Gouger, Anthony Bacon, Jeremy Bentham and Charles Grey, 2nd Earl Grey, but its ideas were considered too radical, and it was unable to attract the required investment.

=== South Australian Land Company ===
After his first proposal failed, Wakefield published his "Plan of a company to be established for the purpose of founding a colony in Southern Australia, purchasing land therein and preparing the land so purchased for the Reception of Immigrants", and the South Australian Land Company (SALC) was formed in 1831 to establish a new colony in the area of South Australia. The SALC sought a Royal Charter for the purchase of land for colonisation, which would raise funding for the transport of immigrants, and for the governance of the new colony to be administered by the SALC. The company anticipated that the centre of government would be on Kangaroo Island or at Port Lincoln on the western side of Spencer Gulf, based on reports from Matthew Flinders.

However, the scheme, which included free trade, self-government and the power to select the Governor, was not approved as these ideas were considered too radical and republican.

== 1833–1835 ==
=== South Australian Association (1833) ===
In 1833, the South Australian Association was established and began to lobby the government for the establishment of a colony in South Australia, with Crown-appointed governance.

Robert Gouger started setting up the South Australian Association from November 1833. Between that time and August 1834, he corresponded with George Grote, Sir Edward Smith-Stanley, Earl of Derby, William Wolryche-Whitmore, Joseph Hume, Liberal MP Sir William Clay, and Charles Shaw-Lefevre. The aim of the association was to bring to fruition the idea of "systematic colonisation", as proposed by Edward Gibbon Wakefield, in the creation of a new colony in South Australia by the British government. The proposal was for a colony that belonged to the Crown but with its administration run by trustees.

The aim of the Association and details of the planned administration of the proposed colony were published on 11 January 1834 in The Spectator:

The object of this Association is to found a Colony, under Royal Charter, and without convict labour, at or near Spencer Gulf, on the south coast of Australia, a tract of country far removed from the existing Penal Settlements...

...The South Australian Association consists of three classes of members, First, Persons who propose to settle in the Colony. Secondly, Persons willing to aid the Association without taking a responsible part in the proceedings. Thirdly, Persons who may take an active part in the preliminary proceedings of the Association, and may become, under the proposed Charter, Trustees for carrying its provisions into effect.

The members of the South Australian Association were men of varied backgrounds, from philanthropists to merchants, including Wakefield, Robert Gouger, Robert Torrens Sr and George Fife Angas.

The association organised a huge public meeting at Exeter Hall in London on the 30 June 1834, to spread awareness about the proposal for the new province and emigration scheme, chaired by Wolryche-Whitmore. The meeting was attended by more than 2,500 people, including well-known philosophers and social reformers, and the speeches and discussions continued for seven hours. Afterwards the association received hundreds of enquiries from people interested in emigration.

=== South Australia Act 1834 ===
The Association lobbied the British government for years, taking part in numerous negotiations and submitting plans that underwent many modifications. Finally, after intervention by the Duke of Wellington, the bill drafted by the Association and presented by Wolryche-Whitmore was presented to Parliament, which passed the South Australia (Foundation) Act on 15 August 1834. The act provided for the settlement as the Province of South Australia, for the sale of lands, for funding of the venture, and for governance.

=== South Australian Colonization Commission ===
The South Australia Act 1834 set out the governance of the new colony by a new body known as the South Australian Colonization Commission, also known as the Colonization Commissioners for South Australia (and variant spellings (Note: The South Australian Colonization Commission is a standardised name authority used by libraries and represented by OCLC, based on some of the Board's documents and publications; the board members are referred to in various documents as the Colonization Commissioners for South Australia.)), which would be based in London. However, the act gave control of the new colony to the Colonial Office as well as the Commissioners, which led to tension between the two and caused problems later.

The act provided that three or more persons could be appointed as Commissioners to be known as Colonization Commissioners for South Australia, to carry out certain parts of the act. The Commissioners formed a Board, which had responsibilities for:

- the disposal of land;
- an Emigration Fund which for conveying poor emigrants from Great Britain and Ireland to South Australia; and
- appointing a treasurer, assistant surveyors and other officers necessary to carry the act into execution.

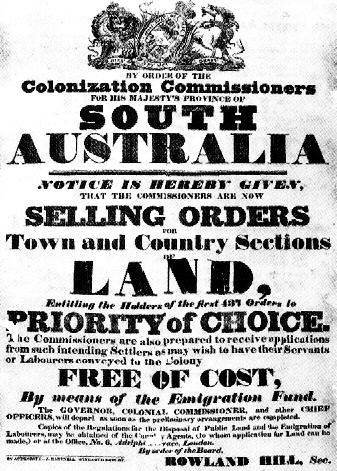
1835 advertisement

The British government appointed Commissioners to oversee implementation of the act, to control sales of land and the administration of revenue: thirteen Commissioners were based in London (at 6 Adelphi Terrace in 1840), with a Resident Commissioner appointed by the board and stationed in the colony. Those first appointed, on 5 May 1835, were Colonel Robert Torrens (Chairman), Rowland Hill (Secretary), G. Barnes (Treasurer), George Fife Angas, Edward Barnard, William Hutt, J. G. Shaw-Lefevre, William Alexander Mackinnon M.P., Samuel Mills, Jacob Barrow Montefiore, Lt Col George Palmer, and John Wright, representing the Colonial Office.

Administrative power was divided between a Governor, John Hindmarsh, who represented the Crown, and the Resident Commissioner, who reported to the Colonisation Commissioners and who was responsible for the survey and sale of land as well as for organising migration and funding. (Note: The transcript as of 6 November 2019 misspells "colonization" as "colonisation" in the long name (as per the long name of the title in the actual document). Throughout the rest of the document, both transcript and original, it is spelt with a Z.) The first Resident Commissioner was James Hurtle Fisher.

The Commissioner of Public Lands was appointed to act under the orders of the Commissioners. All monies were to be submitted to the Lord of His Majesty's Treasury, and be audited in the same manner as other public accounts. A report was required to be submitted to the Secretary of State at least once a year.

Robert Gouger was Colonial Secretary to the Commission, John Hindmarsh was appointed Governor and William Light Surveyor-General. The Commission was responsible for land sales and for land surveying, including choosing the site for the capital city. However, the act did not clarify the powers of the Commission vis-à-vis the Governor, which led to discord for some years.

=== South Australian Company (1835) ===
The South Australian Commission Land Sale Regulations 1835, authored by the Colonization Commission in 1835, stipulated that surveys were to be undertaken and maps to be made available prior to sale of the land. Land could be bought at a uniform price per acre, but it would go to auction in the case of more than one potential buyer. Leases of up to three years could be granted "for pasturage" on unsold lands. All proceeds were to go to the Emigration Fund, set up to help poorer people to migrate to the colony. These regulations were of great significance; the success of the Wakefield scheme to populate and fund the new Province hinged on land development, so land law and regulations governing it were fundamental.

Sales of land had proved difficult; buyers did not rush to buy an acre of wild land for 20 shillings. It was left to the South Australian Company (formed on 15 October 1835, after talented businessman George Fife Angas resigned as Commissioner) to purchase the remaining portion of the £35,000 worth of land that was required for settlement to proceed. The South Australian Company acted as a "third power" in the control of the colony and the one which saved it.

=== Official appointments ===
The South Australia Act was finally ratified on 19 February 1836 and the first appointments made.

The appointment of Governor of South Australia, as the most well-paid position and the most important one, proved complex. Sir Charles Napier (who had written a book about the colonisation of South Australia in 1835) was first approached by a group of emigrants, while the Colonial Office was considering Sir John Franklin. Franklin withdrew in favour of Napier, but Napier quarrelled with the emigrants and made two requests (for access to Treasury funds, and for troops to act as police) which were not met, and he resigned.

Napier favoured Light as Governor; however, the ambitious John Hindmarsh had got wind of the forthcoming appointment, and set out first to see Napier, then woo some powerful supporters in London, including the Lords of the Admiralty before approaching the Colonial Secretary (Gouger). Light was appointed Surveyor-General on 14 December 1835, and on 21 January 1836 Captain Hindmarsh was appointed the first Governor of South Australia. Hindmarsh was rewarded handsomely, while the salaries for the other men were small. Hindmarsh reported to the Colonial Office, while James Hurtle Fisher, Resident Commissioner, was paid far less, despite having practical control of the colony. Not only did Fisher head up the board of Commissioners, but the Treasurer, Emigration Agent, the Surveyor-General and the storekeeper were responsible to him.

Hindmarsh and Fisher quarrelled frequently and could not work together harmoniously, so in 1838 both were recalled to London and a new Governor (George Gawler) appointed, who would also act as Resident Commissioner.

== 1836 ==
=== Letters Patent and the Order-in-Council ===
The procedure for the founding of the South Australian province was unclear to the Board of Commissioners, so Letters Patent, specifically Letters Patent under the Great Seal of the United Kingdom erecting and establishing the Province of South Australia and fixing the boundaries thereof, were presented to the government on 19 February 1836, and with its adoption along with an Order-in-Council on 23 February 1836 the foundation of the South Australian province was achieved.

The main changes in the Letters Patent were to amend the wording in the 1834 document which referred to the land as "unoccupied", and to recognise the rights of the "Aboriginal Natives" to live unhindered within the lands of the Province of South Australia. The first migrant ship, the John Pirie, set sail for the colony three days later. An amendment to the 1834 Act (the South Australia Government Act 1838 (1 & 2 Vict. c. 60), passed 31 July 1838) incorporated the changes.

=== First settlers and Proclamation ===
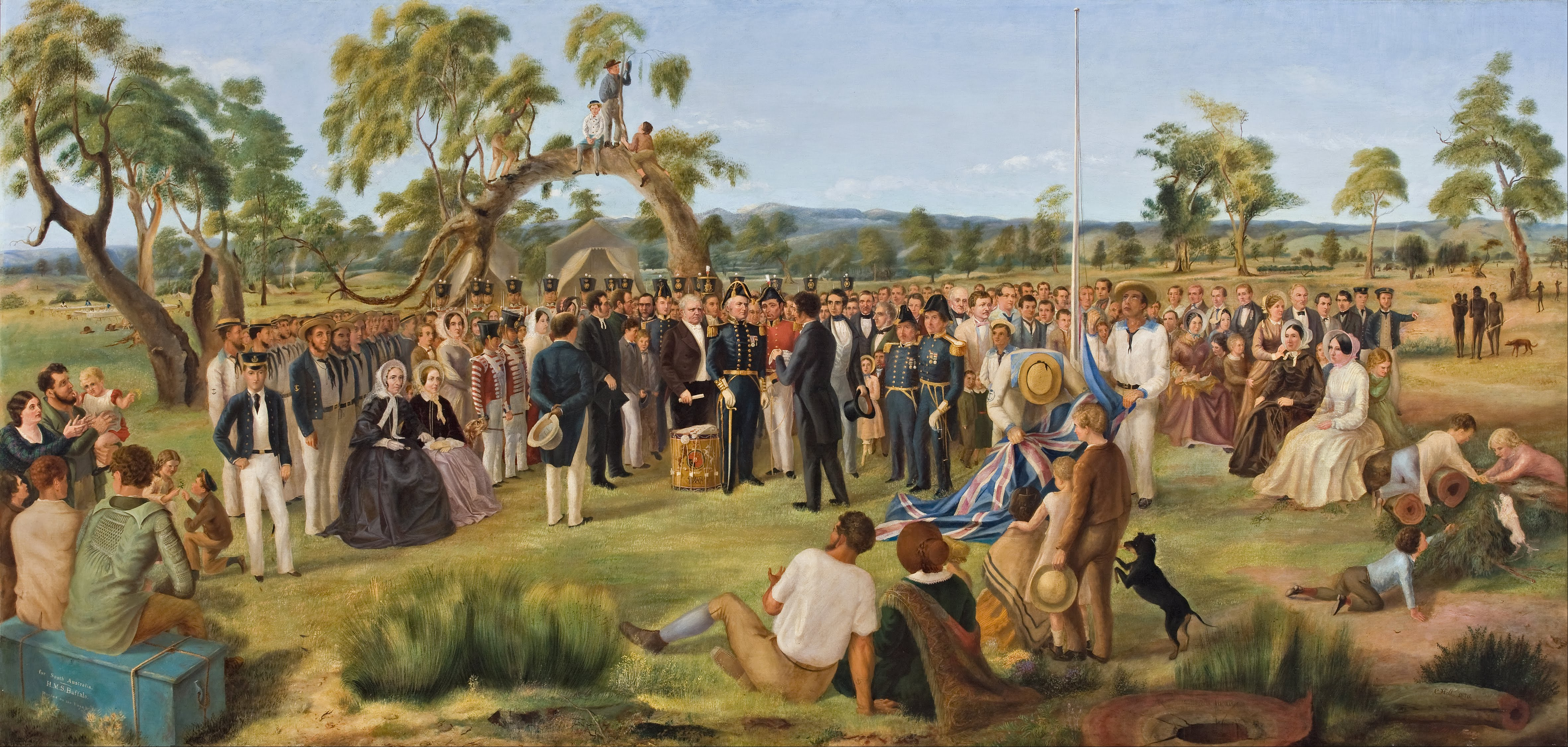
The Proclamation of South Australia 1836, Charles Hill.

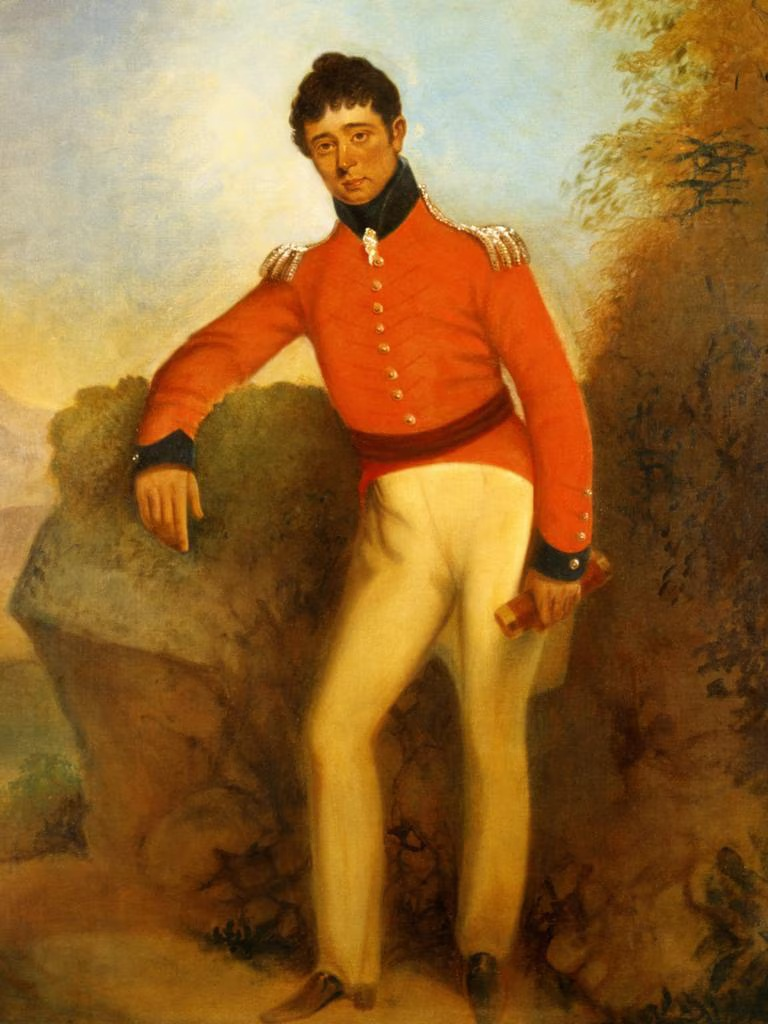
Colonel William Light.

Under the emigration scheme, "worthy" labourers and their families received free passage. They had to be between 15 and 30 years of age, preferably married, and needed two references. Steerage passengers paid £15–20, middle berth £35–40, and cabin class £70. Children under 14 years were charged £3 while those under 1 year were free.

Montefiore and Lt-Col Palmer helped Colonel Light to prepare two of the ships, Rapid and Cygnet. They proposed a new code for emigrant ships carrying more than 100 passengers, which meant having a minimum deck height and including a medical practitioner on board. These reforms reduced mortality and were later adopted by all British emigrant ships.

Four ships chartered by the South Australia Company set sail for South Australia in early 1836:

- On 22 February, just days after the Letters Patent had been adopted, the ship John Pirie set sail with 24 passengers on board;
- The ship Duke of York set sail with 42 passengers on 24 February.
- On 30 March the ship Lady Mary Pelham departed London with 29 passengers.
- The fourth ship was the Emma, which left London with 22 passengers on 21 April.

All four ships of the South Australia Company arrived at Nepean Bay on Kangaroo Island: the Duke of York on 27 July, Lady Mary Pelham on 30 July, John Pirie on 16 August and Emma on 5 October. More ships left in the coming months, making a total of at least nine, which for convenience can be regarded as the First Fleet of South Australia. Apart from the last one, HMS Buffalo, all went to Nepean Bay first.

A settlement was started at Kingscote, at Reeves Point on Kangaroo Island (now a heritage-listed site, as the earliest formal European settlement in South Australia), on 27 July 1836, but this was soon abandoned in favour of a settlement on the mainland. Some of the original ships sailed on to Holdfast Bay in November and December, with Gouger, now Colonial Secretary and Chief Magistrate, arriving on the Africaine on 8 November 1836. The settlers set up camp, to be joined by the Buffalo on 28 December.

The foundation of South Australia is usually considered to be Governor Hindmarsh's Proclamation of South Australia at Glenelg on 28 December 1836.

Colonel Light was given two months to locate the most advantageous location for the main colony. He was required to find a site with a harbour, arable land, fresh water, ready internal and external communications, building materials and drainage. Light rejected potential locations for the new main settlement, including Kangaroo Island, Port Lincoln and Encounter Bay. Light decided that the Adelaide plains were the best location for settlement.

The River Torrens was discovered to the south and Light and his team set about determining the city's precise location and layout. The survey was completed on 11 March 1837. Light's poorly paid and ill-equipped surveying team were expected to begin another massive task of surveying at least 405 square kilometres (156 sq mi) of rural land. Light, despite slowly succumbing to tuberculosis, managed to survey 605.7 square kilometres (233.9 sq mi) (or 150,000 acres (61,000 ha)) by June 1838.

== Settlement growth ==
The settlement grew steadily. In 1836 the South Australian Company imported pure merinos from the German region of Saxony, and cows and goats were also shipped over. Sheep and other livestock were brought in from Van Diemen's Land and New South Wales. The wool industry was the basis of South Australia's economy for the first few years, with the first wool auction held in Adelaide in 1840.

The settlers were mostly British, but some German settlers, mainly "Old Lutherans", also emigrated in the early years. The first large group of Germans arrived in 1838, with the financial assistance of the Emigration Fund. Most moved out of Adelaide and to the Barossa Valley and settlements in the Adelaide Hills such as Hahndorf, living in socially closed communities, by 1842, and did not participate in government until responsible government was granted 15 years later in 1857.

== 1840: Adelaide City Council ==
Established in 1840, with its first meeting held on 4 November 1840, the City of Adelaide Municipal Corporation was the first municipal authority in Australia. At its time of establishment, Adelaide's (and Australia's) first mayor, James Hurtle Fisher, was elected. However, the new corporation suffered financial woes, after several of its actions were unauthorised or reversed by the British government, leading to considerable debt and, so it wound up as insolvent in 1843.

== Architecture and engineering ==
The office of Colonial Architect was established by July 1840, with George Strickland Kingston the first appointee to the role. Other architects who served in this role included Richard Lambeth; William Bennett Hays; and Edward Hamilton, with George Soward acting in the position for six months after Hamilton's resignation in 1860.

Engineering and architecture departments changed in structure and naming over the years, with the names including:

- Colonial Engineer's Office (1841–1852)
- Colonial Architects Department [I] (1852–1854)
- Public Works Department (1854–1857)
- Colonial Architects Department [II] (1854–1860)
- Engineer and Architect's Department (1860–1867)

From 1867, the functions were split into separate entities:

- Engineer in Chief's Department (1867–1906)
- Architect in Chief's Department (1867–1960)

== Demise of the Colonization Commission ==
As it became evident that the colonial administration had brought the province of South Australia to near bankruptcy in 1840, the South Australian Colonization Commission was stripped of its powers. Torrens wrote a report "intended to have been given to the Committee on the Affairs of South Australia, as part of his evidence" on 30 March 1841, outlining how the financial administration of the colony had been mishandled, and how it would not have happened had a proposed loan of £120,000 been raised in June 1840 to the emigration fund, and "a cautious stream of emigration been kept up", and by various means the "calamitous crisis" may have been averted. Records in the State Records of South Australia include a document in which the "Colonization commissioners defend their position as regards responsibility for the crisis" on 17 July 1841.

The post of Agent General for Emigration (covering emigration to all colonies) existed from 1837 to 1840, with Thomas Frederick Elliot, youngest son of Hugh Elliot, appointed to the position. After the South Australian Colonization Commission was abolished, the Colonial Land and Emigration Commission (which had been established by a Commission from Queen Victoria on 14 January 1840), also known as the Colonial Land and Emigration Board, took over its functions, along with those of the Agent-General for Emigration. Although the new Commission was established in 1840, the amalgamation of the South Australian Commission was not completed until early 1843. SA records shows "Copies of letters from the Colonization Commissioners to the Colonial Office, 1841–1842, and from the Colonial Land and Emigration Commissioners to the Colonial Office, 1842–1843 (GRG 48/2)".

(The Colonial Land and Emigration Commission was wound up in 1855, succeeded by the Emigration Commission, which was abolished in 1878.)

== South Australia Act 1842: Crown colony ==
The South Australia Act 1842 (5 & 6 Vict c. 61) is the short title of an Act of the Parliament of the United Kingdom with the long title "An Act to provide for the better Government of South Australia".

The act was passed on 30 July 1842. It repealed the South Australia Act 1834 and the amendments made to that Act, and instituted a different form of Government over the colony. The act was introduced as a result of recommendations by a British Parliamentary Enquiry into the failure of the colonial administration which had brought the province of South Australia near bankruptcy in 1840, and gave the British Government full control of South Australia as a Crown Colony.

== Moves towards independence ==
By the mid 19th century, there was a strong desire for representative and responsible government in the colonies of Australia. The Australian Colonies Government Act 1850 was a landmark piece of legislation, granting representative constitutions to New South Wales, Victoria, South Australia and Tasmania, and the colonies enthusiastically set about writing constitutions which produced democratically progressive parliaments with the British monarch as the symbolic head of state. In 1850 and elections for legislative councils were held in the colonies of Victoria, South Australia and Tasmania.

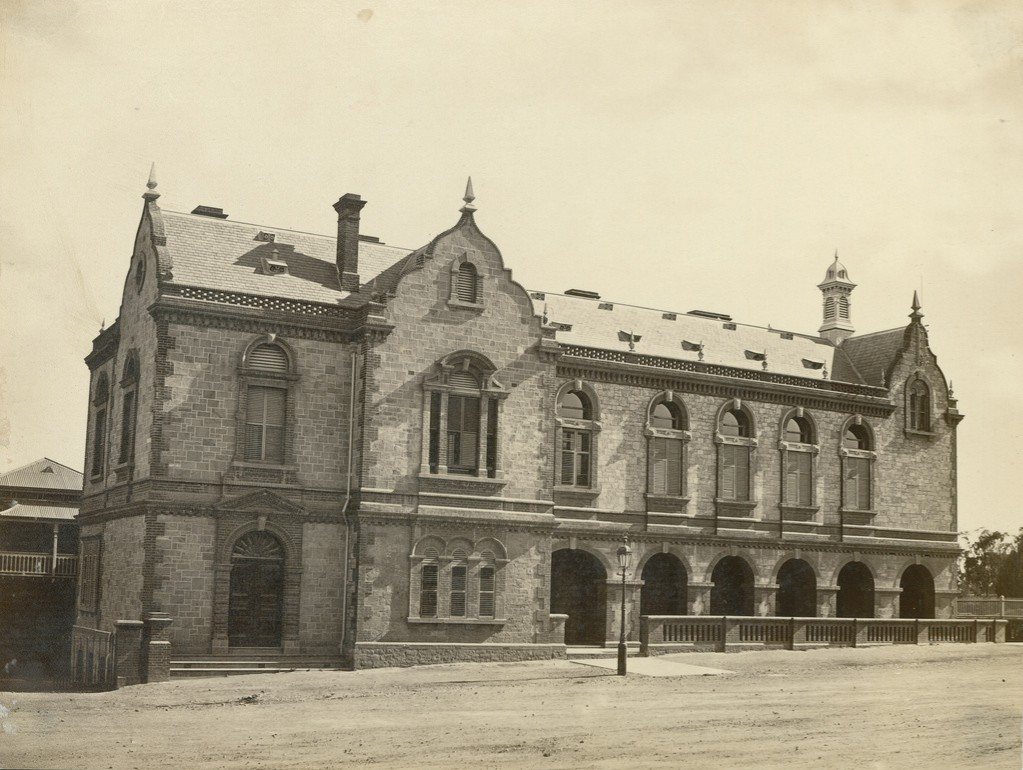
Old Parliament House in 1872

In 1855, limited self-government was granted by London to New South Wales, Victoria, South Australia and Tasmania. An innovative secret ballot was introduced in Victoria, Tasmania and South Australia in 1856, in which the government supplied voting paper containing the names of candidates and voters could select in private. This system was adopted around the world, becoming known as the "Australian Ballot". In the same year, all male British subjects ages 21 or over were granted the right to vote.

=== Self-governing colony (1856) ===
South Australia became a self-governing colony in October 1856 with the ratification of a new constitution by the British parliament via the Constitution Act 1856 (UK). This Act provided for a bicameral Parliament with full authority to enact laws, apart from a few Acts requiring Royal Assent. The Legislative Council was elected by property owners only, while the 37-member House of Assembly was elected on a broad male franchise. A parliament was elected by secret ballot on 9 March 1857, by which time 109,917 people lived in the province.

Several decades after the federation of Australia in 1901, the Constitution Act 1856 was replaced by the Constitution Act 1934.

== See also ==
- History of Adelaide
- History of Australia (1788–1850)
- History of South Australia
- William Light
