= History of South Australia =

The history of South Australia includes the history of the Australian state of South Australia since Federation in 1901, and the area's preceding Indigenous and British colonial societies. Aboriginal Australians of various nations or tribes have lived in South Australia for at least thirty thousand years, while British colonists arrived in the 19th century to establish a free colony. The South Australia Act, 1834 created the Province of South Australia, built according to the principles of systematic colonisation, with no convict settlers.

After the colony nearly went bankrupt, the South Australia Act 1842 gave the British Government full control of South Australia as a Crown Colony. After some amendments to the form of government in the intervening years, South Australia became a self-governing colony in 1857 with the ratification of the Constitution Act 1856, and the Parliament of South Australia was formed.

Meanwhile, European explorers went deep into the interior, discovering some pastoral land, but mainly large tracts of desert terrain. Sheep and other livestock were imported, wheat and other crops were grown where possible, and a thriving viticulture industry was established. German Lutheran refugees set up mission stations and developed the wine industry in the Barossa Valley. Copper was discovered at Kapunda in 1842.

The colony became a cradle of democratic and land reform in Australia. In 1858, it was the first place in the world to institute the system of land registration and transfer named Torrens title after its designer and promoter, South Australian parliamentarian Robert Torrens. Women were granted the vote in the 1890s. South Australia became a State of the Commonwealth of Australia in 1901 following a vote to federate with the other British colonies of Australia. While it has a smaller population than the eastern States, South Australia has often been at the vanguard of political and social change in Australia.

Since World War II refugees and other migrants have boosted both the size and the multicultural nature of the population.

== Aboriginal settlement ==
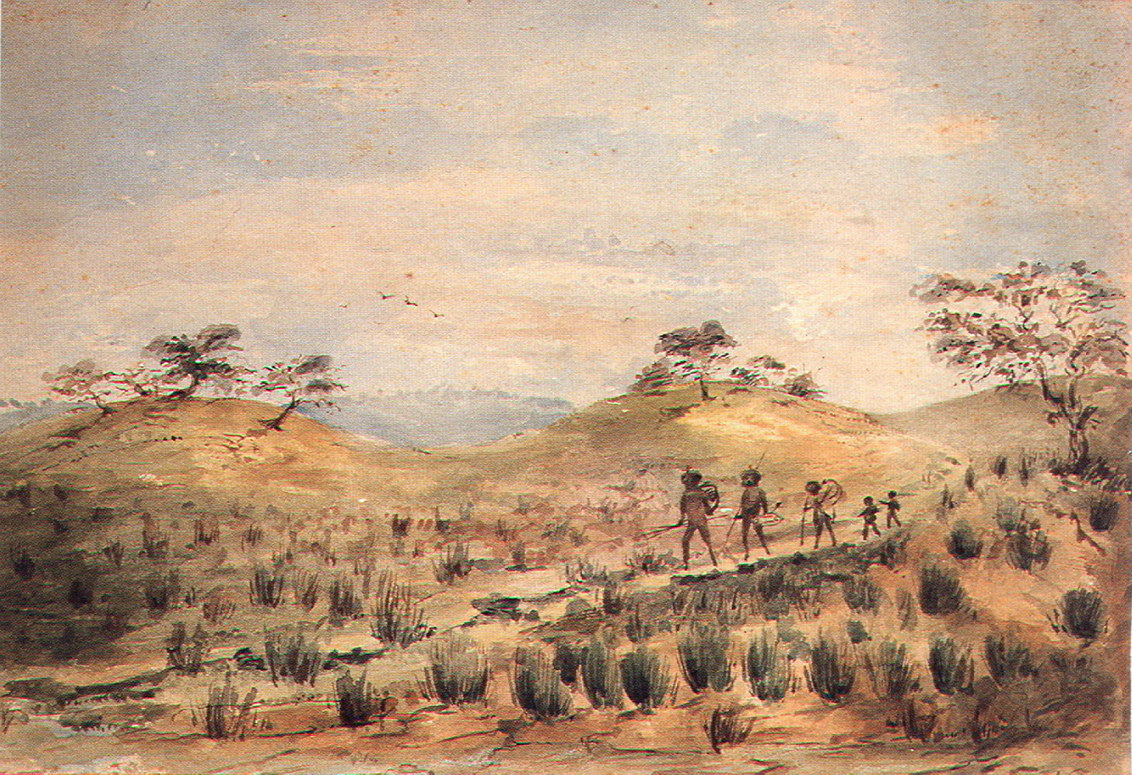
Aboriginal Family Travelling by W.A. Cawthorne

The first people to occupy the area now known as South Australia were Aboriginal Australians. Their presence in northern Australia began at least 65,000 years ago with the arrival of the first of their ancestors by land-bridge from what is now Indonesia. Their descendants moved south and occupied all areas of Australia, including the future South Australia. Temporary campsites in the Roxby dunefields have been dated to 19,000 years ago, and Aboriginal people have continuously occupied South Australian deserts since at least that time. Conservative estimates of the Aboriginal population of South Australia by the time of European contact are around 15,000 with a larger concentration in the southern part of the region. According to mitochondrial DNA research, Aboriginal people reached Eyre Peninsula 49,000-45,000 years ago from both the east (clockwise, along the coast, from northern Australia) and the west (anti-clockwise).

Aboriginal society was made up of small bands, usually numbering around 25, which lived together on a daily basis and shared a particular range of land. The bands comprised one or more extended families, but the membership was fluid and would change depending on available food resources and personal circumstances. Several bands made up one clan, which also had a defined territory and was united by claimed descent from a single ancestor, and several clans made up one tribe, of which there were around 48 in South Australia by the time of European settlement. There was little uniting the clans of an Aboriginal tribe aside from their common language.

The Aboriginal tribal groups all had Dreamings, which were religious traditions tying them to the land. The Dreamings serve as both stories about their ancestors and as the foundation of their societal laws. For example, for the Ngarrindjeri of the lower Murray River, the ancestral hero Ngurunderi fashioned the physical world and gave the people their laws. At the end of his life he traveled to Kangaroo Island, where he passed on to the sky-world. As a result, the Ngarrindjeri viewed the island as a stepping stone for the soul of a dead person to the under world. It was seen as a psychic landscape, not existing in a physical sense, and as a result the island was uninhabited by Aboriginal Australians when Europeans first arrived, and the archaeological record suggests that humans had last lived on Kangaroo Island 4000 years ago.

== European exploration ==
The first Europeans to explore South Australia were the crew of a Dutch vessel, the Gulden Zeepaert, led by Captain François Thijssen in 1627. From Cape Leeuwin in Western Australia, the ship followed the southern coast of Australia east for 1,000 miles (1,600 km), reaching the edge of the Great Australian Bight. He named the whole area he'd explored Nuyts Land, after Pieter Nuyts, a distinguished passenger on the ship.

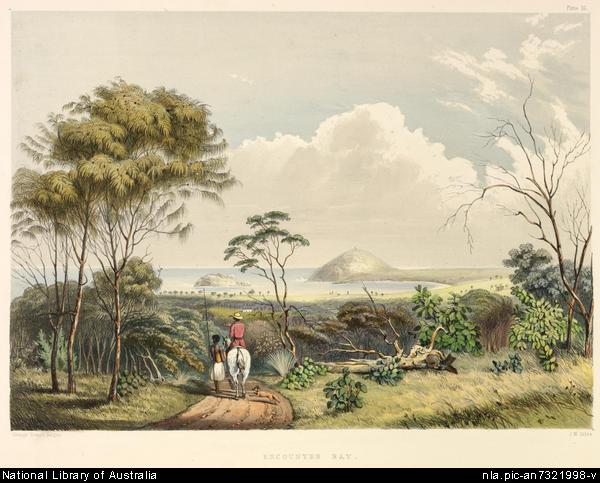
Encounter Bay, 1847

In 1801–02 Matthew Flinders led the first circumnavigation of Australia aboard HMS Investigator, a Royal Navy survey ship to verify that the eastern colony of New South Wales and the western land called New Holland were part of the same landmass. In March 1802 he reached Kangaroo Island, and was surprised to find it uninhabited. French Captain Nicolas Baudin was also on a survey mission in 1802, independently charting the southern coast of the Australian continent with the French naval ships the Géographe and the Naturaliste. The British and French expeditions sighted each other on 8 April 1802, and despite believing that France and Britain were still at war at the time (neither knew that the War of the Second Coalition had ended), they met peacefully at Encounter Bay.

Following the discovery of Kangaroo Island by Flinders, lawless sealers known as "Straitsmen" (they mainly lived on the islands of the Bass Strait) came to the island. Their main work was hunting seals and whales. Once they had become established on the island, to satisfy their need for wives the sealers kidnapped Aboriginal women from Tasmania and the mainland and brought them there. By 1820, there were reportedly nine sealers living on the island with Aboriginal wives, and by the mid-1820s as many as 30 of them. The "wife-collecting trips" to the mainland were violent affairs, sometimes involving killing the women's husbands.

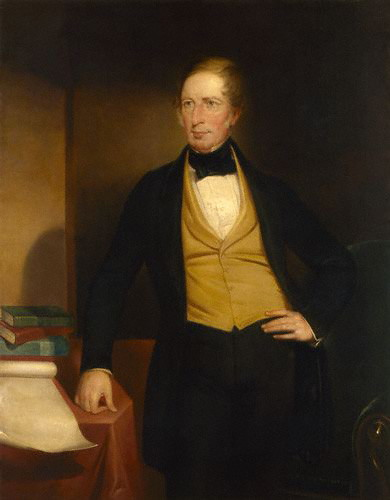
Charles Sturt

Charles Sturt led an expedition from New South Wales in 1829, which followed first the Murrumbidgee River into a "broad and noble river", which he named the Murray River. His party then followed this river to its junction with the Darling River and continued down river on to Lake Alexandrina, where the Murray meets the sea. He wrote:

Hurried …as my view of it was, my eye never fell on a country of more promising aspect, or of more favourable position, than that which occupies the space between the lake and the ranges of St. Vincent's Gulf, and, continuing northerly from Mount Barker, stretches away, without any visible boundary.

— Charles Sturt, Expeditions into Southern Australia

Sturt recommended further examination of the area, and New South Wales Governor Ralph Darling sent Captain Collet Barker to carry out a survey of the area in 1831. After swimming across the mouth of the Murray River alone, Barker was killed by Aboriginal people. Sturt thought that might have been out of revenge for the atrocities committed by sealers. Despite that, his more detailed survey led Sturt to conclude:

…it would appear that a spot has, at length, been found upon the south coast of New Holland, to which the colonist might venture with every prospect of success, and in whose valleys the exile might hope to build for himself and for his family a peaceful and prosperous home. All who have ever landed upon the eastern shore of St. Vincent's Gulf, agree as to the richness of its soil, and the abundance of its pasture.

— Charles Sturt, Expeditions into Southern Australia

While travelling through the lower regions of the Murray, Sturt also wrote that he was surprised by the large number of Aboriginal Australians he encountered, but the Aboriginal population of the region was struck by an epidemic at the same time as Sturt's expedition (likely smallpox), leading to a much smaller native population when colonists arrived seven years later.

== British preparation for establishing a colony ==
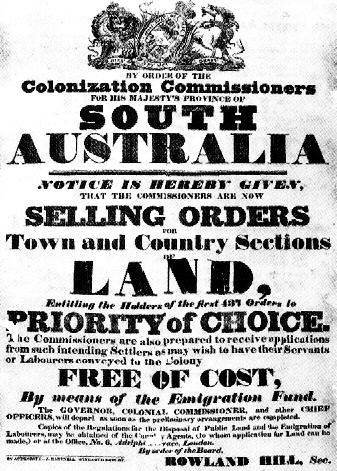
An 1835 advertisement for the sale of land in South Australia

In 1828 Robert Gouger and Edward Gibbon Wakefield were both looking to start a colony based on free settlement. Gouger met with Wakefield (who was still in prison at the time) in January 1829, and Wakefield suggested that instead of granting free land to settlers as had happened in other colonies, the colony should use the principle of "the universal sale of land instead of land grants, and the exclusive employment of the purchasers' moneys to promote emigration".

Gouger established the National Colonisation Society in February 1830, and although initially the proposal didn't attract much attention, after Sturt's discovery of the Murray River became public knowledge, its prospects were revived. By December, the Gulf St Vincent was being pitched as the location of the colony, and the National Colonisation Society put their proposal to the Colonial Office in May 1831.

=== Founding organisations and laws, 1834–1836 ===
The South Australian Association, with the aid of such figures as George Grote, William Molesworth and the Duke of Wellington persuaded the British Parliament to pass the South Australia Act, 1834. The Act defined the province of South Australia as being "that part of Australia which lies between the meridians of the one hundred and thirty-second and one hundred and forty-first degrees of east longitude, and between the southern ocean and the twenty-six degrees of south latitude, together with all and every the islands adjacent thereto, and the bays and gulphs". South Australia thus became a colony authorised by an act of parliament. The colony and its capital city were named prior to settlement.

The planners and founders of South Australia called for the colony to be their ideal embodiment of what they perceived to be the best qualities of British society. They sought: to prevent a reliance of convict labour found in other colonies, thus also reducing unemployment; to eliminate religious discrimination and; to make the colony economically self-sufficient. It was intended that free settlers would be attracted on the basis of freedom in the political, economic, civil and religious spheres, as well as opportunities for wealth through farming and commerce.

Hence the transportation of convicts from the United Kingdom was forbidden by the South Australia Act, despite many convicts being transported to penal settlements in New South Wales (between 1788 and 1842), Van Diemen's Land (Tasmania; 1802–1853), and Moreton Bay (Queensland; 1825–1842). (Later, convicts were also transported to Western Australia, between 1850 and 1868). "Poor Emigrants", while they were assisted by an Emigration Fund, were required to bring their families with them. The Act further specified that the colony was also intended to be developed at no cost to the British government (such as the expenses incurred in transporting convicts).

So that South Australia stood a better chance of being self-sufficient, a £20,000 surety had to be created and £35,000 worth of land was to be sold in the colony before any settlement occurred. These conditions were fulfilled before the end of 1835, possibly with Raikes Currie or his family bank, Curries & Co., acting as surety.

The Act also included a promise of representative government when the population reached 50,000 people. A guarantee of the rights of "any Aboriginal Natives" and their descendants to lands they 'now actually occupied or enjoyed' was included in the 1836 Letters Patent enabling the South Australia Act included.

The western and eastern boundaries of the colony were set at 132° and 141° East of Greenwich, and to the north at the Tropic of Capricorn, (23° 26′ South). The western and eastern boundary points were chosen as they marked the extent of coastline first surveyed by Matthew Flinders in 1802 (Nicolas Baudin's priority being ignored).

The South Australia Act 1834 imposed various financial obligations on the colonists that had to be met before the province could be created. In order to meet one of these obligations, pertaining to the sale of land, George Fife Angas created the South Australian Company, along with his banker, Raikes Currie. Both Angas and Currie contributed significantly to the sale of property, with the former contributing £40,000 and the latter (and the Currie family) contributing £9,000 (possibly as much as £50,000).

=== Official appointments ===
By 1835, negotiations had been completed for the founding of the new colony of South Australia. Colonel Charles James Napier was first offered the position as Governor, but turned it down because he was not allowed to take a body of troops, and recommended Colonel William Light for the position instead. However, before receiving the recommendation, Lord Glenelg had already appointed Royal Navy Rear-Admiral John Hindmarsh as Governor in January 1836. Light was appointed Surveyor General of South Australia the following month, and various other officials were appointed to other positions: James Hurtle Fisher was Resident Commissioner and Registrar; Robert Gouger, Colonial Secretary; John Jeffcott, Judge; Charles Mann, Advocate-General; Osmond Gilles, Colonial Treasurer; George Strickland Kingston Deputy Surveyor, along with a team of assistant surveyors.

=== Proclamation of South Australia (1836) ===
Province of South Australia
- British colony
- 1836–1901
- Flag (1876–1904)
- Government
  - Type: Self-governing colony (1836–1842); Crown colony (1842–1901)
- Monarch
  - 1834–1837: William IV first
  - 1837–1901: Victoria last
- Governor
  - 1836–1838: John Hindmarsh first
  - 1899–1901: Hallam Tennyson last
- History
  - Independence from the Colony of New South Wales: 1836
  - Federation of Australia: 1901
Preceded by	Succeeded by
Colony of New South Wales	Australia; South Australia

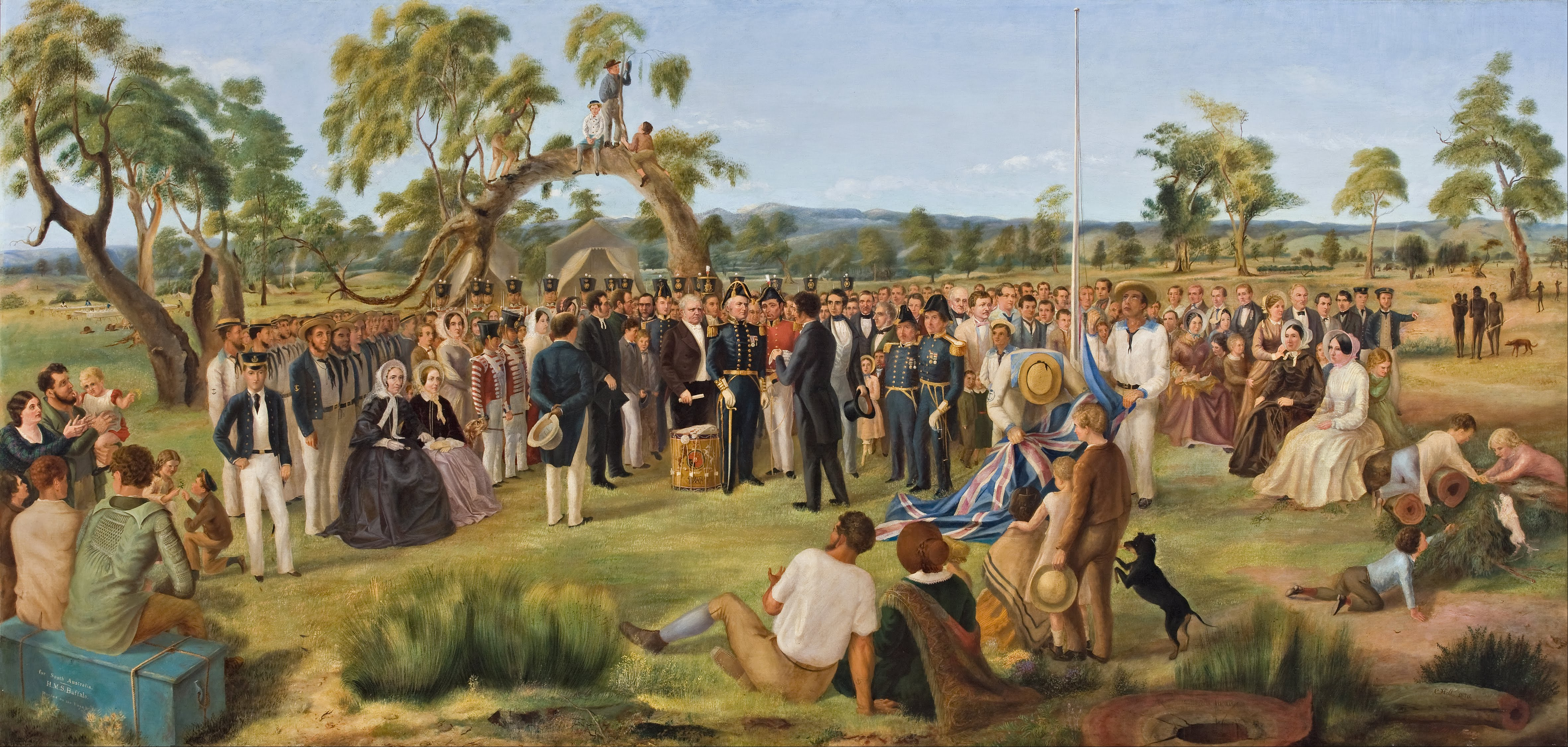
The Proclamation of South Australia 1836, Charles Hill

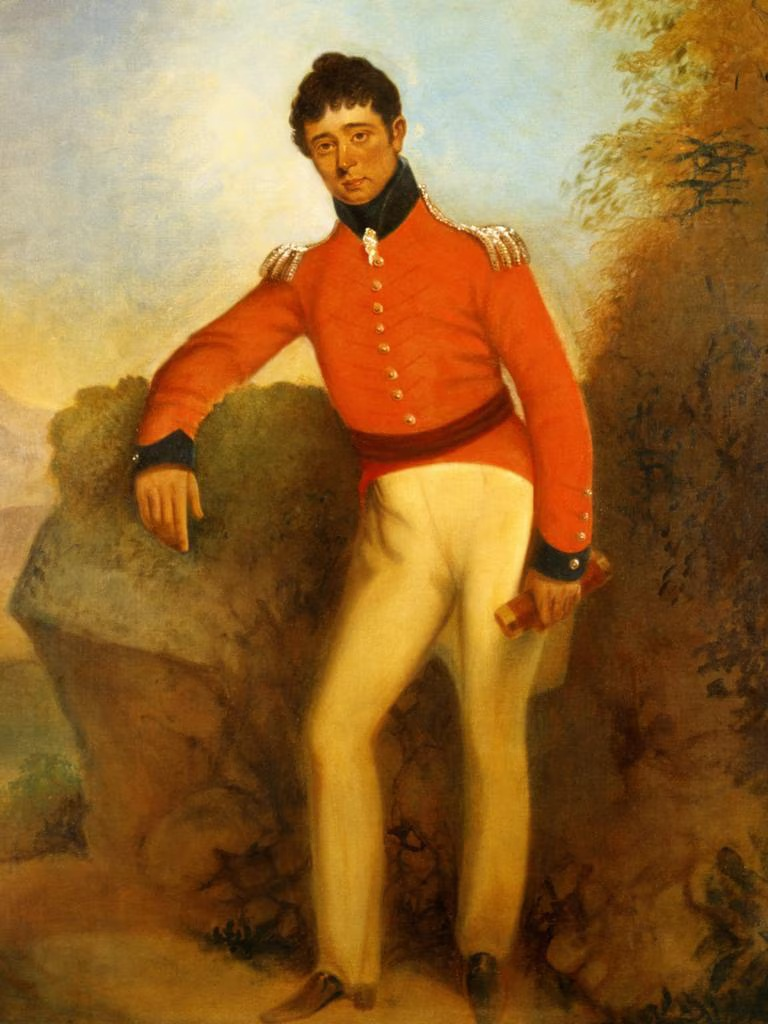
Colonel William Light

In early 1836, nine ships accommodating 636 people in total set sail for South Australia. The ships in the fleet were the Cygnet (carrying Light's surveyors), Africaine, Tam O'Shanter, Rapid, HMS Buffalo (carrying Hindmarsh), John Pirie, Emma, Lady Mary Pelham and Duke of York.

After an eight-month voyage around the world, most of the ships took supplies and settlers to Kangaroo Island. They landed at Kingscote to await official decisions on the location and administration of the new colony.

Light was given two months to locate the most advantageous location for the main colony. He was required to find a site with a harbour, arable land, fresh water, ready internal and external communications, building materials and drainage. Light rejected potential locations for the new main settlement, including Kangaroo Island, Port Lincoln and Encounter Bay. Light decided that the Adelaide plains were the best location for settlement.

Most of the settlers were moved from Kangaroo Island to Holdfast Bay with Governor Hindmarsh arriving on 28 December 1836 to proclaim the province of South Australia. The Port River was sighted and deemed to be a suitable harbour, but there was no fresh water available nearby.

The River Torrens was discovered to the south and Light and his team set about determining the city's precise location and layout. The survey was completed on 11 March 1837. Light's poorly paid and ill-equipped surveying team were expected to begin another massive task of surveying at least 405 square kilometres (156 sq mi) of rural land. Light, despite slowly succumbing to tuberculosis, managed to survey 605.7 square kilometres (233.9 sq mi) by June 1838.

Most other colonies had been founded by Governors with near total authority. The South Australia Act 1834 gave control of the new colony to the Colonial Office (i.e. the Crown, represented by the Governor) as well as the Board of Colonisation Commissioners (with an appointed Resident Commissioner), which led to tensions between the two and caused problems later. The survey and sale of land, as well as migration arrangements and funding, were responsibilities of the Resident Commissioner, so that the British Government could not interfere with the business affairs or freedom of religion of the settlers. Relations between Hindmarsh and the Resident Commissioner quickly broke down.

=== South Australia Act 1842: Crown takes control ===
Land speculation, economic recession and inept administration combined to cause the Wakefield scheme to fail, and South Australia was spending far more than its revenue. Financial bankruptcy of the colony in 1841 caused London to act. The immediate issue was heavy spending, and the failure of the colonization commissioners to use borrowing powers to secure loans. Gawler was replaced as governor by Captain George Grey. In London the secretary for the colonies assumed responsibility for South Australia.

A British Parliamentary Enquiry recommended a more orthodox form of colonial administration to replace the Colonisation Commissioners.

The South Australia Act 1842 instituted a different form of Government over the Province of South Australia. The Act was introduced as a result of recommendations by a British Parliamentary Enquiry into the failure of the colonial administration, which had brought the province of South Australia near bankruptcy by 1840, and gave the British Government full control of South Australia as a Crown Colony. It provided for the Governor and at least seven other officers to be appointed to form a legislative council for the governance of South Australia. Governor Grey sharply cut spending. The colony soon had full employment, and exports of primary products were increasing. Systematic emigration was resumed at the end of 1844.

== Expansion of the colony ==
=== Government ===
Until 1851, the Governor ruled with the assistance of an appointed Executive Council of paid officials. Land development and settlement was the basis of the Wakefield vision. Land law and regulations governing it were fundamental to the foundation of the Province and allowed for land to be bought at a uniform price per acre (regardless of quality), with auctions for land desired by more than one buyer, and leases made available on unused land. Proceeds from land were to fund the Emigration Fund to assist poor settlers to come as tradesmen and labourers.

Agitation for representative government quickly emerged. Most other colonies had been founded by Governors with near total authority, but in South Australia, power was initially divided between the Governor and the Resident Commissioner, so that government could not interfere with the business affairs or freedom of religion of the settlers. From 1843 to 1851, the colony was governed by a legislative council of seven appointed members. By 1851 the colony was experimenting with a partially elected council, with 16 of 24 members of the South Australian Legislative Council being elected that year and the remainder appointed.

=== General Registry Office (GRO) ===
"General Law Title" or the "Old System Title" was the English land law adopted at the time of foundation of South Australia as a colony in December 1836. The General Registry Office holds deeds and records of land transactions from 1837 until the implementation of Real Property Act 1858. This law implemented a system which became known as Torrens title, after Sir Robert Richard Torrens, who instigated the bill and ensured its passage through parliament.

After this, all new land transactions were conducted under the new system, using a land title. The role of the GRO included property transactions (mortgages, conveyances, leases, land grants, indentures, wills, probate), as well as deeds for a number of other actions (such as deed poll name changes). The documents called "memorials" represent those original deeds registered and held by the GRO, whereas the certified copies held by the GRO were known as "deposits" or "enrolments".

The General Registry Office and Old Systems land records are (as of July 2019) held at the Land Services Group at Netley, where there are alphabetical indices of records from 1842 to the present, for land that does not fall under the Torrens title.

=== First agriculture: Sheep, wheat and wine ===
In 1836 the South Australian Company imported pure merinos from the German region of Saxony, and cows and goats were also shipped over. Sheep and other livestock were brought in from Van Diemen's Land and later New South Wales. The wool industry was the basis of South Australia's economy for the first few years, with the first wool auction was held in Adelaide in 1840. Vast tracts of land were leased by "Squatters" until required for agriculture. Once the land was surveyed it was put up for sale and the Squatters had to buy their runs or move on.

Most bought their land when it came up for sale, disadvantaging farmers who had a hard time finding good and unoccupied land. Farms took longer to establish than sheep runs and were expensive to set up. Despite this by 1860 wheat farms ranged from Encounter Bay in the south to Clare in the north.

The settlers were mostly British, but some German settlers, mainly "Old Lutherans", also emigrated in the early years. The first large group of Germans arrived in 1838, with the financial assistance of the Emigration Fund. Most moved out of Adelaide and to the Barossa Valley and settlements in the Adelaide Hills such as Hahndorf, living in socially closed communities, by 1842, and did not participate in government until 15 years later.

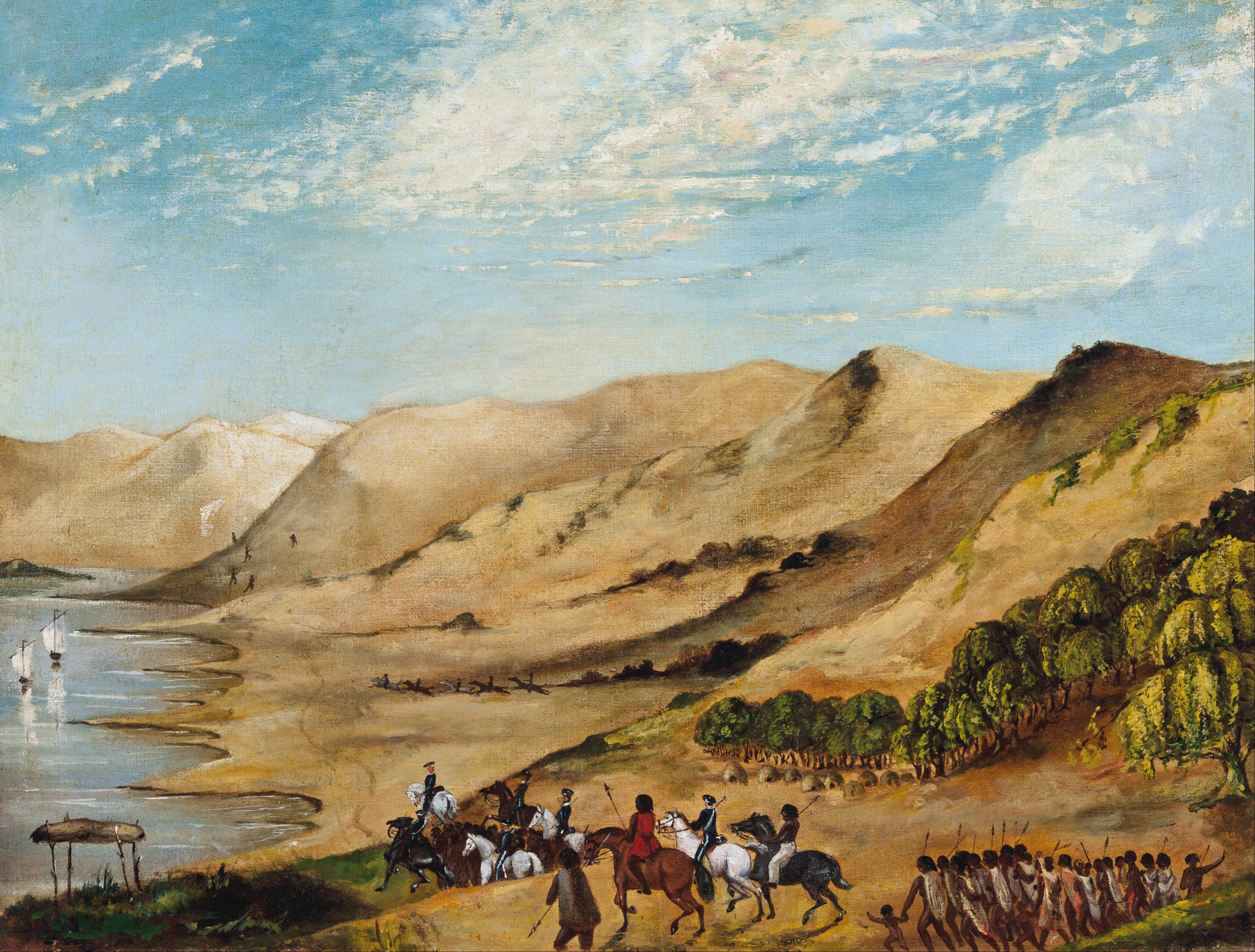
The punitive expedition to the Coorong after 25 survivors of the shipwreck Maria were massacred by Aboriginal people in 1840.

In the Coorong Massacre in 1840, the brigantine Maria was shipwrecked near Cape Jaffa. All 25 survivors were massacred by people of the Milmenrura ("big Murray tribe") when trying to find their way to Adelaide. A punitive expedition authorised by Governor George Gawler and carried out by William Pullen and Major O'Halloran executed two alleged perpetrators. The men killed in retribution were not put to trial and not proven to be those who carried out the massacre.

The wine growing regions of McLaren Vale and the Barossa Valley were established in the 1840s. Port Pirie was founded in 1845.

Copper was discovered near Kapunda in 1842. In 1845 even larger deposits of copper were discovered at Burra which brought wealth to the Adelaide shopkeepers who invested in the mine. John Ridley invented a reaping machine in 1843 which changed farming methods throughout South Australia and the nation at large. By 1843, 93 km^{2} (36 sq mi) of land was growing wheat (compared to 0.08 km^{2} (0.031 sq mi) in 1838). Toward the end of the century South Australia became known as the "granary of Australia".

Gold discoveries in Victoria in 1851 brought a severe labour shortage in Adelaide which was created by the exodus of workers leaving to seek their fortunes on the goldfields. However, this also created high demand for South Australian wheat. The situation improved when prospectors returned with their gold finds.

During the 1850s over 5,400 hard working Germans settled in South Australia. Many started off the wine industry in the Barossa Valley and they opened the first Lutheran church in Hahndorf.

South Australians were keen to establish trade links with Victoria and New South Wales, but overland transport was too slow. A£4,000 prize was offered in 1850 by the South Australian government for the first two people to navigate the River Murray in an iron steamboat as far as its junction with the Darling River. In 1853 William Randell of Mannum and Francis Cadell of Adelaide, unintentionally making the attempt at the same time, raced each other to Swan Hill with Cadell coming in first.

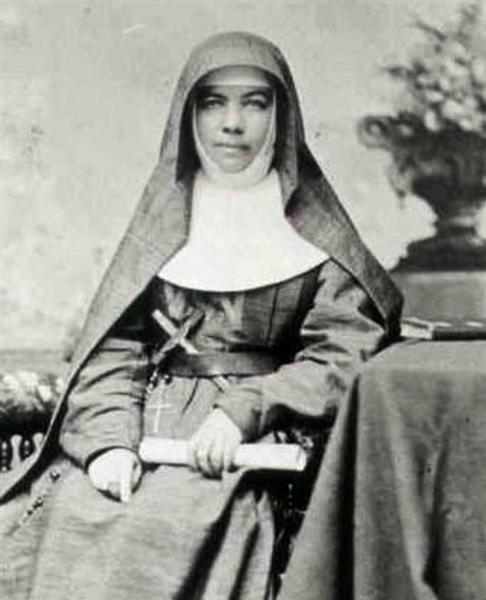
Saint Mary Mackillop co-founded an order of nuns in rural South Australia in 1866 and became the first Australian saint of the Catholic Church in 2010.

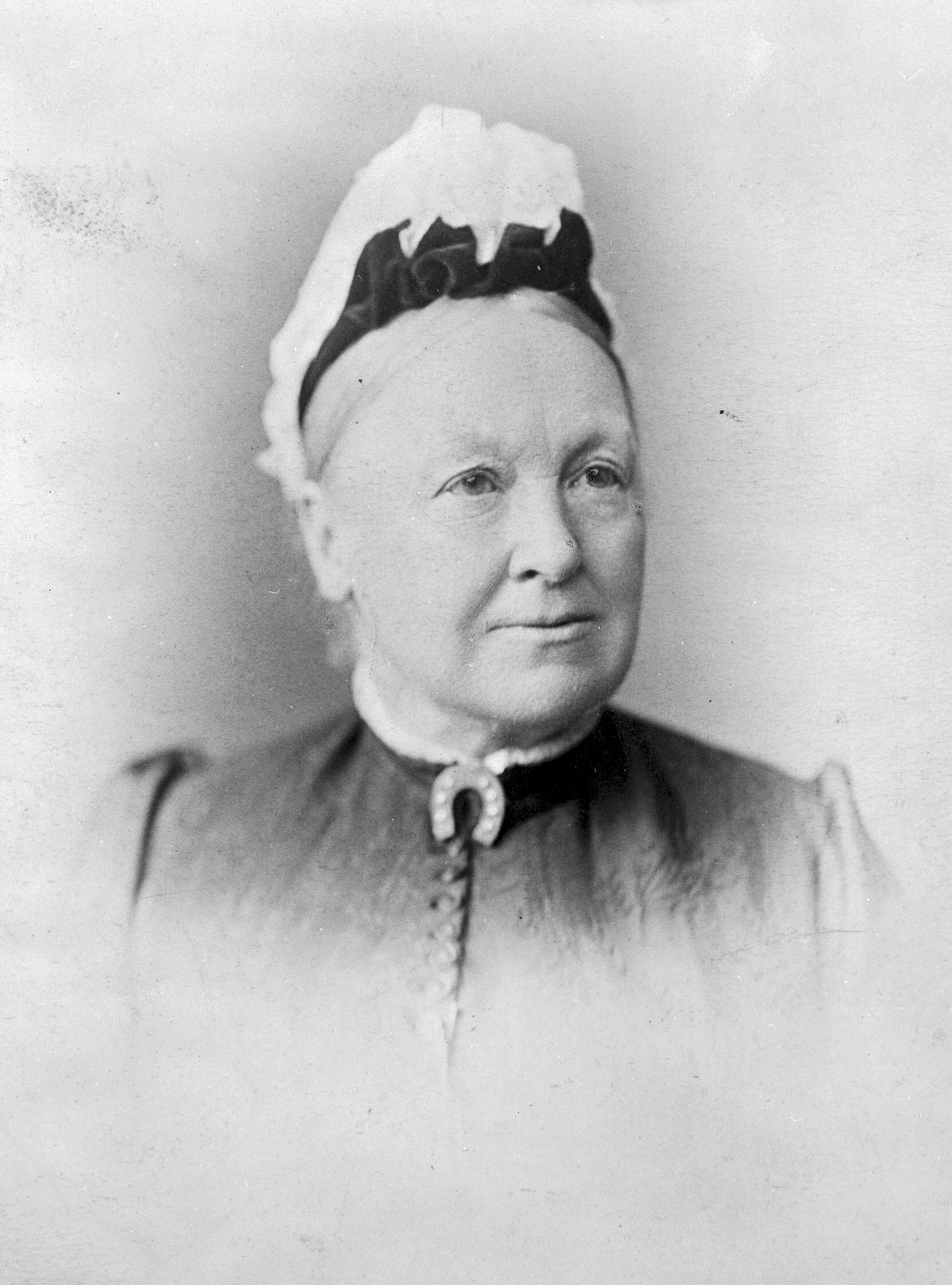
South Australian suffragette Catherine Helen Spence. In 1895 women in South Australia were among the first in the world to attain the vote and were the first to be able to stand for parliament.

==== Limited self-government ====
By the mid 19th century, there was a strong desire for representative and responsible government in the colonies of Australia. In 1840, the Adelaide City Council was established as the first city council in the Australian colonies. The Australian Colonies Government Act 1850 was a landmark development which granted representative constitutions to New South Wales, Victoria, South Australia and Tasmania and the colonies enthusiastically set about writing constitutions which produced democratically progressive parliaments with the British monarch as the symbolic head of state. In 1850 and elections for legislative councils were held in the colonies of Victoria, South Australia and Tasmania.

In 1855, limited self-government was granted by London to New South Wales, Victoria, South Australia and Tasmania. An innovative secret ballot was introduced in Victoria, Tasmania and South Australia in 1856, in which the government supplied voting paper containing the names of candidates and voters could select in private. This system was adopted around the world, becoming known as the "Australian Ballot". 1855 also saw the granting of the right to vote to all male British subjects 21 years or over in South Australia.

Further copper discoveries were made in 1859 at Wallaroo and in 1861 at Moonta.

South Australia was a haven for religious refugees leaving Europe over this period. German Lutherans established the influential Hermmannsberg Mission in Central Australia in 1870. David Unaipon who was to become a preacher and Australia's first Aboriginal author was born at Point McLeay Mission in South Australia in 1872. The son of Australia's first Aboriginal pastor, he is today honoured on the Australian $50 note.

Saint Mary Mackillop co-founded the Sisters of St Joseph of the Sacred Heart in rural South Australia in 1866. Dedicated to the education of the children of the poor, it was the first religious order to be founded by an Australian. Mackillop established schools, orphanages and welfare institutions throughout the colonies. She became the first Australian to be canonised as a saint of the Roman Catholic Church in 2010.

During John McDouall Stuart's 1862 expedition to the north coast of Australia he discovered 200,000 km^{2} (77,000 sq mi) of grazing territory to the west of Lake Torrens and Lake Eyre. Stuart succeeded in traversing Central Australia from south to north. His expedition mapped out the route which was later followed by the Australian Overland Telegraph Line. South Australia was made responsible for the administration of the Northern Territory, which was previously part of New South Wales.

In 1877, it became the first part of the British Empire to legalise Trade Unions and in 1891, four United Labor Party candidates were elected to Parliament, becoming the first endorsed Labor members in Australia.

In the 1890s, Australia was affected by a severe economic depression. Financial institutions in Melbourne and banks in Sydney closed. The national fertility rate fell and immigration was reduced to a trickle. The value of South Australia's exports nearly halved. Drought and poor harvests from 1884 compounded the problems, with some families leaving for Western Australia. Adelaide was not as badly hit as the larger gold-rush cities of Sydney and Melbourne, and silver and lead discoveries at Broken Hill provided some relief.

=== Self-governing colony (1856) ===
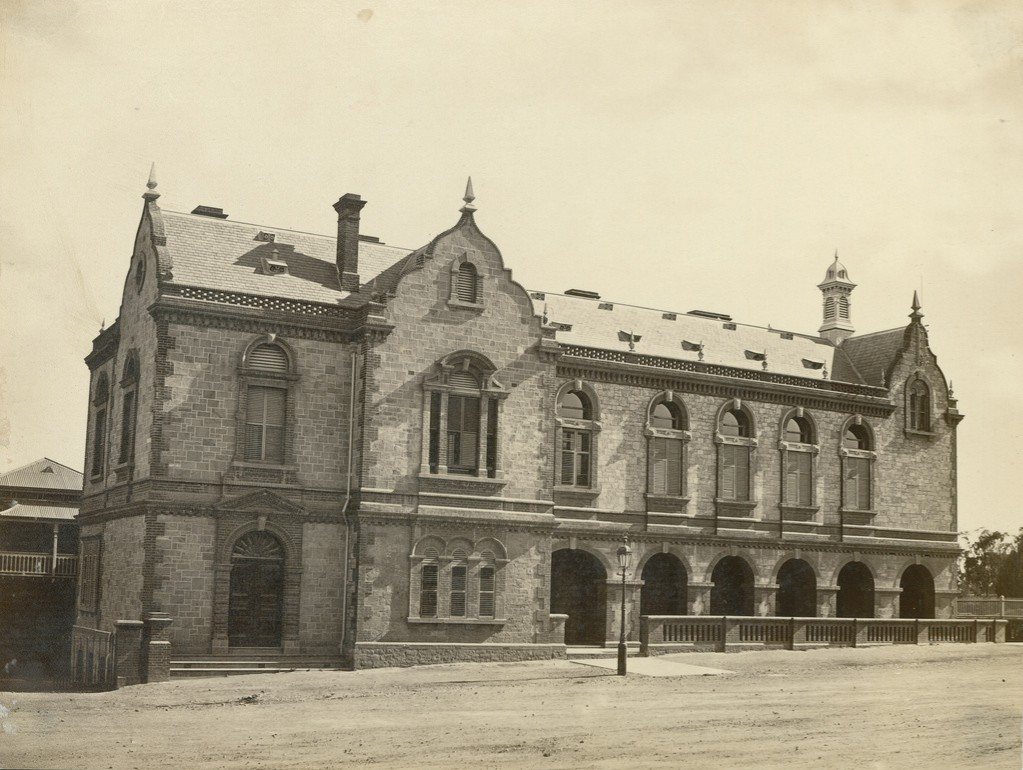
Old Parliament House in 1872

South Australia became a self-governing colony in October 1856 with the ratification of a new constitution by the British parliament via the Constitution Act 1856. A bicameral parliament was elected on 9 March 1857, by which time 109,917 people lived in the province.

South Australia's 1856 constitution was among the most democratic in the world – more so than the other Australian colonies, the United Kingdom and most European countries at that time. It provided for: Adult male suffrage (including indigenous men); Secret ballot voting; one man, one vote; no property qualifications for Members of its House of Assembly and a relatively low property qualification for Members of its Legislative Council.

Propertied women in the colony of South Australia were granted the vote in 1861. In the Constitutional Amendment Act 1894, all women became eligible to vote for the Parliament of South Australia when they won the same voting rights as men, and they did so in South Australia's 1895 elections.

The Constitutional Amendment (Adult Suffrage) Act 1894 was also the first legislation in the world permitting women also to stand for election to political office and, in 1897, Catherine Helen Spence became the first female political candidate for political office, unsuccessfully standing for election as a delegate to the Federal Convention on Australian Federation.

By the 1890s, several new factors were drawing the Australian colonies towards political union and South Australians voted by referendum to join the Commonwealth of Australia.

== Governance of Aboriginal people ==
=== 19th century ===
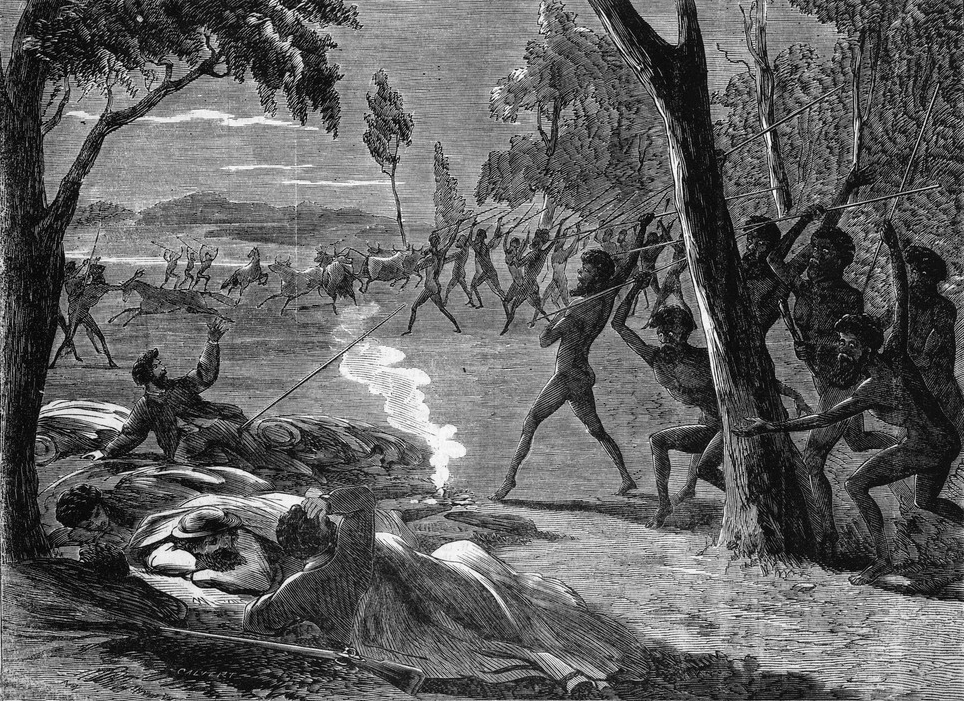
"Night attack of the natives on Lake Hope" (1866 wood engraving)

Protectors of Aborigines had been appointed from as early as 1836 in South Australia (with Matthew Moorhouse as the first gazetted appointment as Chief Protector in 1839), with the Governor proclaiming that Aboriginal people were "to be considered as much under the safeguard of the law as the Colonists themselves, and equally entitled to the Privileges of British Subjects". Under the Aboriginal Orphans Ordinance 1844 the Protector was made legal guardian of "every half-caste and other unprotected Aboriginal child whose parents are dead or unknown". Schools and Aboriginal reserves were set up. Despite these attempts at protection, Moorhouse himself presided over the Rufus River massacre in 1841. The office of Protector was abolished in 1856; within four years, 35 of the 42 Aboriginal reserves had been leased to settlers.

The protection of the Aboriginal people was mostly left to missionaries from 1856 to 1881 (after the office of Protector was abolished, the work being done by Sub-protectors reporting direct to the Commissioner of Crown Lands), when another Protector was appointed.

=== 20th century ===
In 1912, the Aborigines' Office, which had operated under a succession of different ministers, became the Aborigines' Department, initially a change in name only. In 1918, an Advisory Council of Aborigines was appointed, under powers given by the Aborigines Act 1911, to take control of the existing missions (at Point McLeay, Point Pearce, Killalpaninna and Koonibba). The Aborigines Act Amendment Act 1939 abolished the office of Chief Protector of Aborigines and the Advisory Council, and created the Aborigines Protection Board, of which Charles Duguid was a founding member.

=== 21st century ===
First proposed during the Marshall government, the Malinauskas government is proceeding with establishing the First Nations Voice to Parliament by the end of 2023.

== Twentieth century ==
In 1900, South Australia responded to the Boxer Rebellion in China by sending the South Australian warship HMAS Protector to join the international coalition defending foreign nationals from the Boxers.

On 1 January 1901, following a proclamation by Queen Victoria, South Australia ceased to be a self-governing colony and became a state of the Commonwealth of Australia. In 1906, South Australia's first uranium mine was opened at Radium Hill. In 1910, the government of John Verran served as the first complete Labor party government in the world.

28,000 South Australians volunteered to fight during Australia's involvement in the First World War. Adelaide enjoyed a post-war boom but with the return of droughts, entered the depression of the 1930s, later returning to prosperity with strong government leadership. Secondary industries helped reduce the state's dependence on primary industries. The 1933 census recorded the state population at 580,949, which was less of an increase than other states due to the state's economic limitations.

After the second world war, the Woomera rocket range was established in 1947 as part of the Anglo-Australian Joint Project – at that time one of only four rocket ranges in the world. Busy through the 1950s, Woomera played an important role in the development of space technologies. With US assistance, Wresat 1, the first Australian satellite, was launched from Woomera, in November 1967 – a joint project of the Weapons Research Establishment and the University of Adelaide. The project made Australia only the 4th country to launch its own satellite from its own territory – and a landmark in Australian science.

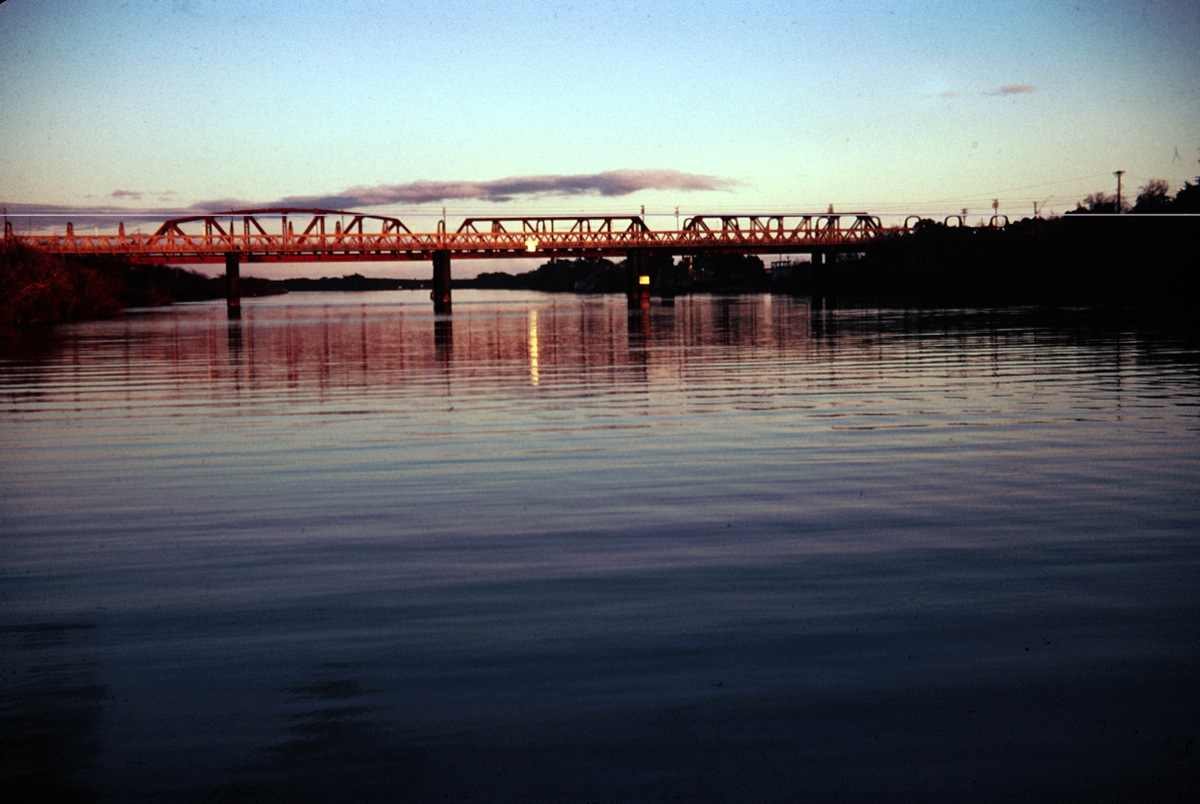
The 1925 Murray Bridge rail bridge over the Murray River, linking Adelaide to Melbourne.

Rocket launches largely ceased from the early 1970s, though some space related activity has continued into the 21st century and the base is now controlled by the Royal Australian Air Force. The University of Adelaide has a long history of scientific research and scholarship of international significance, and five Nobel Laureates have been associated with the university: Sir William Henry Bragg (Physics 1915); Sir William Lawrence Bragg (Physics 1915); Sir Howard Walter Florey (Physiology or Medicine 1945); J. M. Coetzee (Literature 2003); Robin Warren (Physiology or Medicine 2005).

After World War II, an assisted migration scheme brought 215,000 emigrants of all nationalities to South Australia between 1947 and 1973. Murray Bridge, earlier known as Mobilong and then Edward's Crossing, was given its current name in the 1920s. It is now the fourth most populous region in South Australia, preceded by Adelaide, Mount Gambier and Whyalla.

The 1960s and 1970s saw the introduction of a series of landmark Australian legislative "firsts" in South Australia, including: the 1966 Prohibition of Discrimination Act, which prohibited discrimination on the grounds of race, colour, or country of origin; and 1975 The Sex Discrimination Act, which made discrimination on the grounds of gender, marital status, or sexuality unlawful. In 1975 Parliament "decriminalised" homosexual acts; and in 1976 rape in marriage was made a criminal offence.

Construction of the Adelaide Festival Centre began in 1970 and South Australia's Sir Robert Helpmann became director of the Adelaide Festival of Arts. The South Australian Film Corporation (SAFC) was established by the Don Dunstan government in 1972 and played a significant role in the revival of Australian cinema, with such critically acclaimed works as Picnic at Hanging Rock and Breaker Morant.

In 1976, the Pitjantjatjara Land Rights Act gave the Pitjantjatjara and Yankunytjatjara Aboriginal peoples inalienable freehold title over 100,000 km of their land. That same year, South Australia appointed the first Aboriginal governor of an Australian state when Sir Douglas Nicholls was made Governor of South Australia.

In 1987, copper, gold, and silver production began at the Olympic Dam mine. Olympic Dam also possesses the world's largest known deposit of uranium.

During the commercial property boom of the 1980s the State Bank of South Australia was the fastest growing bank in Australia – but in 1991, the bank collapsed and Labor Premier John Bannon announced that, due to bad debts, the bank would have to be rescued by the taxpayers – subsequently, the bank's book debt rose to $3 billion. A Royal Commission was called and Premier Bannon resigned after appearing before it.

== See also ==
- Aboriginal peoples of South Australia
- Australian Overland Telegraph Line
- British nuclear tests at Maralinga
- Goyder's Line
- Historical Records of Australia
- List of cities and towns in South Australia
- Proclamation Day
- South Australia-Victoria border dispute
- Timeline of South Australian history

== Bibliography ==
- Birchall, Matthew. "History, Sovereignty, Capital: Company Colonization in South Australia and New Zealand." Journal of Global History16.1 (2021): 141–157. online
- Blewett, Neal, and Dean Jaensch. Playford to Dunstan: the politics of transition (1971) on late 1960s.
- Brock, Peggy, and Tom Gara. Colonialism and Its Aftermath: A History of Aboriginal South Australia (Wakefield Press, 2017)
- Clarke, Philip A. (1998). "The Aboriginal presence on Kangaroo Island, South Australia". In Simpson, Jane; Hercus, Luise (eds.). Aboriginal Portraits of 19th Century South Australia. Australian National University. pp. 14–48.
- Clyne, Robert. (1987), Colonial Blue: A history of the South Australian Police Force, 1836-1916, Wakefield Press
- Collins, Carolyn and Paul Sendziuk, eds. (2018) Foundational Fictions in South Australian History (Wakefield Press, 2018)
- Douglas, K., 2014. "'For the sake of a little grass': A Comparative History of Settler Science and Environmental Limits in South Australia and the Great Plains." in Climate, Science, and Colonization (pp. 99–117). Palgrave Macmillan, New York.
- Emerson, J. (2006). History of the independent bar of South Australia. Papinian Publishing.
- Finniss, B.T. (1886). The Constitutional History of South Australia During Twenty-One Years from the Foundation of the Settlement in 1836 to the Inauguration of Responsible Government in 1857 (PDF). Adelaide: W.C. Rigby.
- Flood, Josephine (2006). Original Australians: Story of the Aboriginal people. Allen & Unwin. ISBN 1741148723.
- Gara, Tom. Colonialism and its aftermath: a history of Aboriginal South Australia (Adelaide: Wakefield Press, 2017).
- Godfrey, Barry. "Prison versus Western Australia: Which worked best, the Australian penal colony or the English convict prison system?." British Journal of Criminology 59.5 (2019): 1139–1160.
- Goldsworthy, David. "Before the Country Party: The Farmers' Mutual Association of South Australia." Journal of the Royal Australian Historical Society (Sep 1971), Vol. 57 Issue 3, pp. 242–253. Covers 1879 to 1892.
- Hamshere, Cyril. "Sir George Grey: A Great Proconsul" History Today (April 1979), Vol. 29 Issue 4, pp. 240–247. The Governor of South Australia, 1841–45; also New Zealand, 1845–53, and 1861–68, and Cape Colony, 1854–61.
- Harris, Edwyna, and Sumner J. La Croix. "Prices, Wages, and Welfare in Early Colonial South Australia, 1836-1850" (University of Hawai'i at Mānoa, Department of Economics, 2019) online
- Harris, Edwyna, and Sumner La Croix. "South Australia’s employment relief program for assisted immigrants: promises and reality, 1838-1843." Labor History 61.5-6 (2020): 586–607. online
- Hylton, J. (2012). South Australia illustrated: Colonial painting in the land of promise. online
- Jauncey, Dorothy. (2004), Bardi Grubs and Frog Cakes – South Australian Words, Oxford University Press ISBN 0-19-551770-9
- Kwan, Elizabeth. (1987), Living in South Australia: A Social History Volume 1: From Before 1836 to 1914, South Australian Government Printer
- Langley, Michael. "Wakefield and South Australia" History Today (Oct 1969), Vol. 19 Issue 10, pp. 704–712.
- "SA Newspapers: Non-English language newspapers". State Library of South Australia. 2007.
- McKnoght, Tom. "A Survey of the History of Manufacturing in South Australia" Proceedings of the Royal Geographical Society of Australasia (1966), Vol. 67, pp. 69–80. Covers 1837 To 1929.
- Manwaring, Rob (2008). A collaborative history of social innovation in South Australia (PDF). The History & Future of Social Innovation Conference, 19–12 June 2008. University of South Australia: Hawke Research Institute for Sustainable Societies. Archived from the original (PDF) on 8 March 2021.
- Manwaring, Rob, Mark Dean, and Josh Holloway. "South Australia." in Australian politics and policy (2019) pp: 265–280. online
- Marsden, Susan. (1998), "South Australia" in G Davison, J Hirst, S MacIntyre, eds, The Oxford Companion to Australian History, (Oxford University Press) ISBN 0-19-553597-9
- Moon, Karen. "Perception and Appraisal of the South Australian Landscape 1836-1850" Proceedings Royal Geographical Society of Australasia 1969, Vol. 70, pp. 41–64.
- Parkin, Andrew. "The Dunstan Legacy." Policy, Organisation and Society 17.1 (1999): 129–139. online
- Pascoe, J. J., ed. History of Adelaide and Vicinity: with a general sketch of the province of South Australia and biographies of representative men (Hussey & Gillingham, 1901) online.
- Pike, Douglas. (1967) Paradise of Dissent: South Australia 1829-1857 (Melbourne UP, 2nd edition)
- Pitt, G. H. "The Crisis of 1841: Its Causes and Consequences" South Australiana (1972) 11#2 pp. 43–81.
- Prest, Wilfred, ed. (2001). The Wakefield Companion to South Australian History Adelaide: Wakefield Press.
- Richards, Eric, ed. (1986) The Flinders History of South Australia: Social History. Adelaide: Wakefield Press, A standard scholarly history
- Sendziuk, Paul; Foster, Robert (2018). History of South Australia. Cambridge University Press. ISBN 9781108630030., a standard scholarly history
- Tonkin, John. "Religious history in Western Australia [Introduction to special issue: Tonkin, John (ed.). Religion and Society in Western Australia]" Studies in Western Australian History, No. 9, Oct 1987: 1–9. online ISSN: 0314–7525.
- Walker, R. B. "German-Language Press and People in South Australia, 1848-1900" Journal of the Royal Australian Historical Society (June 1972), Vol. 58 Issue 2, pp. 121–140.
- Whitelock, Derek. (1985), Adelaide: From Colony to Jubilee, Adelaide: Savvas Publishing
- Williams, Eleanore. (1977) "Through Eastern Eyes: Large Freehold Estates in South Australia," Australian Economic History Review. March 1977, Vol. 17 Issue 1, pp. 47–57; covers 19th century

=== Historiography and memory ===
- Calvert, John. (2012). "Australia's 'quiet' historian: Douglas Pike's formation as a historian" Journal of the Historical Society of South Australia (40), 10.
- Crowley, F. K. (1955) "South Australian Business History: A Bibliography." Business Archives & History. 6#1 pp. 84–88.
- Darian-Smith, Kate, and Paula Hamilton, eds. Remembering Migration: Oral histories and heritage in Australia (Springer, 2019). online
- Loyau, George Ettienne (1885), Notable South Australians (1st ed.), Adelaide: George E. Loyau, Wikidata Q43346523 – via Wikisource
- Young, J. D. "South Australian Historians and Wakefield's 'scheme'." Historical Studies (00182559). 1969, Vol. 14 Issue 53, pp. 32–53.

=== Primary sources ===
- Dyer, S. W. ed. "Rural Life Between The Wars, By Joan Airy." South Australiana 1975, Vol. 14 Issue 1, pp. 3–19. Life on a sheep farm in 1930s.
- Pruul, Susan, ed. "Memoirs of Michael O'Dea" South Australiana 1976, Vol. 15 Issue 1, pp. 3–35; by an Irishman who worked in the gold fields 1849 to 1855.
- Sturt, Charles (1834). Two expeditions into the interior of southern Australia : during the years 1828, 1829, 1830, and 1831 : with observations on the soil, climate, and general resources of the colony of New South Wales (2nd ed.). London: Smith, Elder. hdl:2027/uc1.b3114188.
- Matthew Smith (1843). "South Australia" . Journal of the Royal Geographical Society of London. 13: 341–344. ISSN 0266-6235. Wikidata Q108763979 – via Wikisource.
