= Colony of New South Wales =

British colony (1788–1901)

- 1788–1901
- Flag (1876–1901) Coat of arms
- Anthem: "God Save the King/Queen"
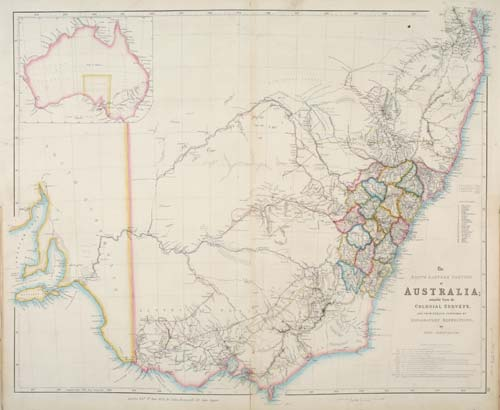
- Government: Self-governing colony
- Monarch
  - 1788–1820: George III (first)
  - 1837–1901: Victoria (last)
- Governor
  - 1788–1792: Arthur Phillip (first)
  - 1899–1901: William Lygon, 7th Earl Beauchamp (last)
- Premier
  - 1856 (first): Stuart Donaldson
  - 1899-1901 (last): William Lyne
- Legislature: Parliament of New South Wales
- History
  - Colonization started: 18 January 1788
  - Separation of Van Diemen's Land: 3 December 1825
  - Separation of South Australia: 28 December 1836
  - Separation of New Zealand: 1 July 1841
  - Separation of Victoria: 1 July 1851
  - Separation of Queensland: 6 June 1859
  - Separation of the Northern Territory: 6 July 1863
  - Federation of Australia: 1 January 1901
Preceded by
Aboriginal Australians
Succeeded by
Van Diemen's Land
Colony of South Australia
Colony of New Zealand
Colony of Victoria
Colony of Queensland
New South Wales
- Today part of: Australia; New Zealand

The Colony of New South Wales was a self-governing Crown colony within the British Empire that existed from 7 February 1788 until 1 January 1901, when it federated to become a state of the Commonwealth of Australia. At its greatest extent, the colony included the present-day Australian states of New South Wales, Queensland, Victoria, Tasmania and South Australia, as well as the Northern Territory and New Zealand.

Responsible government in New South Wales was achieved on 6 June 1856 with Sir Stuart Alexander Donaldson appointed by Governor Sir William Denison as its first Colonial Secretary.

== History ==
=== Formation ===
On 18 January 1788, the First Fleet led by Captain Arthur Phillip founded the first British settlement in Australian history as a penal colony. Having set sail on 13 May 1787, Captain Arthur Phillip assumed the role of governor of the settlement upon arrival. On 18 January 1788, the first ship of the First Fleet, HMS Supply, with Phillip aboard, reached Botany Bay. However, Botany Bay was found to be unsuitable by Phillip. After Phillip led the exploration of Port Jackson, he sailed and reached Sydney Cove on the night of 25 January 1788.

On the morning of 26 January, men on board this ship went ashore and started clearing land for a camp. In the afternoon-evening, they erected a flag pole, raised the Union Jack, and the officers ashore made toasts to the Royal Family and the success of the colony. Probably some, or all, ships of the First Fleet were present for the flag raising.

On the morning of 27 January, all the fit male convicts, marines, and likely some ships' crew went ashore to establish the camp and find food. The female convicts came ashore on 6 February 1788. About midday on 7 February, the convicts, marines and others who were staying were gathered by the Governor for the reading of the proclamation of New South Wales and a long reading of the rights of the convicts and others. Thus, the Colony of New South Wales was formally proclaimed on 7 February 1788. Before that, British naval administration applied. The colony faced extreme difficulty in its earliest years from water scarcity.

=== Separation of Van Diemen's Land ===
Major-General Ralph Darling was appointed Governor of New South Wales in 1825, and in the same year he visited Hobart Town, and on 3 December proclaimed the establishment of the independent colony, of which he was Governor for three days.

=== Separation of South Australia ===
In 1834, the British Parliament passed the South Australia Act 1834, which enabled the colony of South Australia to be established.

=== Separation of New Zealand ===
On 16 November 1840, the British government issued the Charter for Erecting the Colony of New Zealand. The Charter stated that the Colony of New Zealand would be established as a Crown colony separate from New South Wales on 1 July 1841.

=== Separation of Victoria ===
On 1 July 1851, writs were issued for the election of the first Victorian Legislative Council, and the absolute independence of Victoria from New South Wales was established proclaiming a new Colony of Victoria.

=== Separation of Queensland ===
Evolution of Australia's states and territories.

A public meeting was held in 1851 to consider Queensland's proposed separation from New South Wales. On 6 June 1859, Queen Victoria signed Letters Patent to form the separate Colony of Queensland. Brisbane was named as the capital city. On 10 December 1859, a proclamation was read by British author George Bowen, whereby Queensland was formally separated from the state of New South Wales. As a result, Bowen became the first Governor of Queensland. On 22 May 1860 the first Queensland election was held and Robert Herbert, Bowen's private secretary, was appointed as the first Premier of Queensland.

== Demographics ==
According to the 1891 Census:

- The Colony of New South Wales had a population of 1,123,954 people, with males counted at 608,003 and females counted at 515,951. This number included the population of people living in the Federal Territory, now the Australian Capital Territory. This number also did not include full-blooded Aboriginals.

== Federation ==
The Federation of Australia was the process by which the six separate British self-governing colonies of Queensland, New South Wales, Victoria, Tasmania, South Australia, and Western Australia agreed to unite and form the Commonwealth of Australia, establishing a system of federalism in Australia. This effectively changed New South Wales from being a colony to a state of Australia.

=== Australia Act ===
In the Australia Act 1986, the states of Australia achieved independence from the United Kingdom as constituents of Australian confederation. The Act followed discovery that, when Australia ratified the 1931 Statute of Westminster, only the federal state became independent of the United Kingdom due to State concerns of a grab for power by the Commonwealth Government. The 1986 Act ended the British government's authority over the six Australian unitary states in confederation, just as it had ceased to have authority over the Commonwealth during the inter-war period. All colonial-era laws were no longer subject to Imperial powers of disallowance and reservation. Acts of the federal state, i.e. the Commonwealth of Australia, remain subject to power of disallowance and reservation by the monarch of Australia, per sections 59 and 60 of the Australian Constitution. But as the Australian monarch can act only on the advice of the Australian Prime Minister, those two provisions are effectively dead letters.

== See also ==
- History of New South Wales
- History of Australia (1788–1850)
- History of Australia (1851–1900)
