= South Australia Act 1842 =

Act of the Parliament of the United Kingdom

South Australia Act 1842 (Note: The citation of this act by this short title was authorised by the Short Titles Act 1896, section 1 and the first schedule. Due to the repeal of those provisions it is now authorised by section 19(2) of the Interpretation Act 1978.)
- Act of Parliament
- Parliament of the United Kingdom
- Long title: An Act to provide for the better Government of South Australia.
- Citation: 5 & 6 Vict. c. 61
- Territorial extent: United Kingdom; Colony of South Australia

Dates
- Royal assent: 30 July 1842
- Commencement: 30 July 1842 (Note: The Acts of Parliament (Commencement) Act 1793.)
- Repealed: England and Wales: 18 April 1949 (Note: The Criminal Justice Act 1948 (Date of Commencement) Order 1949 (SI 1949/139).); Scotland:
Other legislation
| Repeals/revokes | South Australia Act 1834 |
| Repealed by | England and Wales: Criminal Justice Act 1948; Scotland: Criminal Justice (Scotland) Act 1949 |

Status: Repealed

Text of statute as originally enacted

The South Australia Act 1842 (5 & 6 Vict. c. 61) was an act of the Parliament of the United Kingdom, which repealed the South Australia Act 1834 (4 & 5 Will. 4. c. 95), as well as amendments made to that act, and instituted a different form of Government over the Province of South Australia. The act was introduced as a result of recommendations by a British parliamentary enquiry into the failure of the colonial administration which had brought the province of South Australia near bankruptcy in 1840, and gave the British Government full control of South Australia as a Crown Colony. The act was passed on 30 July 1842.

== Background ==
Land speculation, economic recession and inept administration combined to cause the Wakefield scheme to fail, and South Australia was spending far more than its revenue. Financial bankruptcy of the colony in 1841 caused London to act. The immediate issue was heavy spending, and the failure of the colonisation commissioners to use borrowing powers to secure loans. Gawler was replaced as governor by Captain Grey, and the in London the Colonial Secretary assumed responsibility for South Australia. The new governor sharply cut spending. The colony soon had full employment, and exports of primary products were increasing. Systematic emigration was resumed at the end of 1844.

A British parliamentary enquiry recommended a more orthodox form of colonial administration to replace the Colonisation Commissioners.

== Provisions ==
The act provided for the Governor and at least seven other officers to be appointed to form a legislative council for the governance of South Australia. The act also made provision for a commission to initiate the establishment of democratic government, electoral districts, requirements for voting rights, and terms of office.

The act also provided for the annual repayment of debts to those who had invested in the South Australia Colonial Revenue Securities at a rate of three pounds ten shillings per one hundred pounds of principal invested, with interest to be paid on the principal owing. The act also provided for funding of these payments out of the general funds of the British government as a repayable loan to the South Australian government, if payments could not be met. The act also cleared the South Australian government of an earlier £155,000 loan from general funds of the British government.

Its chapter number is 5 & 6 Vict. c. 61, meaning the 61st act that was passed in the reign of Queen Victoria, that started in the fifth year of her reign and finished in the sixth.

This act repealed the South Australia Act 1834 (4 & 5 Will. 4. c. 95), passing all powers to the Governor and an appointed Legislative Council of at least seven members nominated by the Crown, subject to the Colonial Secretary. The British Government was thus given full control of the Province as a Crown Colony.

== Subsequent developments ==
The whole act was repealed for England and Wales by section 83(3) of, and part I of the tenth schedule to, the Criminal Justice Act 1948 (11 & 12 Geo. 6. c. 58), which came into force on 18 April 1949.

The whole act was repealed for Scotland by section 79(3) of, and the twelfth schedule to, the Criminal Justice (Scotland) Act 1949 (12, 13 & 14 Geo. 6. c. 94), which came into force on.

== See also ==
- British colonisation of South Australia
