= Colonial Land and Emigration Commission =

Former British Government Agency

The Colonial Land and Emigration Commission (CLEC), also known as the Colonial Land and Emigration Board, was a British government authority under the supervision of the Secretary of State for the Colonies that facilitated emigration within the British Empire. Established by a formal commission from Queen Victoria on 14 January 1840, the commission took over the responsibilities of two existing government offices, the South Australian Colonization Commission, and the Agent-General for Emigration.

== History ==
In 1837 Thomas Frederick Elliot (1808–1880) had been appointed to the latter post, and he became a member of the new body. Most immigrants it assisted settled in the settler colonies of New South Wales, Victoria, and South Australia, with smaller numbers settling in British colonies in New Zealand, the Falkland Islands, in parts of Australia, and South Africa (the Cape of Good Hope). The commission issued reports showing total numbers of immigrants to various colonies, which were published in newspapers, and also published the Colonization Circular from at least 1843 to 1870.

In 1852, shortly after qualifying, Irish surgeon Andrew Sexton Gray was appointed as a surgeon-superintendent for the commission, which involved accompanying migrants on assisted passage schemes as the ship's chief medical officer, as well as maintaining their welfare and discipline.

From 1856 the commission was known generally known as the "Emigration Commission", after the British Government granted Australian colonies control of land sales within their territories. However, technically the full name remained in force until its abolition. It was formally abolished on 31 March 1878, when its staff and remaining functions were transferred to the Colonial Office.

== List of commissioners ==
| Name | Start date | End date |
|---|---|---|
| Thomas Frederick Elliot | 10 January 1840 | 27 November 1847 |
| Robert Torrens | 10 January 1840 | 19 July 1841 |
| Edward Ernest Villiers | 10 January 1840 | 30 October 1843 |
| John George Shaw-Lefevre | 19 July 1841 | 19 May 1846 |
| Charles Alexander Wood | 28 November 1843 | 2 July 1857 |
| Fredric Rogers | 19 May 1846 | May 1860 |
| Thomas Wiliam Clinton Murdoch | 27 November 1847 | 31 December 1876 |
| Stephen Walcott | 21 July 1860 | 31 March 1878 |
