= South Australia Act 1834 =

Act of the Parliament of the United Kingdom

- Act of Parliament
- Parliament of the United Kingdom
- Long title: An Act to empower His Majesty to erect South Australia into a British Province or Provinces and to provide for the Colonization and Government thereof.
- Citation: 4 & 5 Will. 4. c. 95
- Territorial extent: United Kingdom; Colony of South Australia

Dates
- Royal assent: 15 August 1834
- Commencement: 15 August 1834 (Note: The Acts of Parliament (Commencement) Act 1793.)
- Repealed: 30 July 1842
Other legislation
Amended by	South Australia Government Act 1838
Repealed by	South Australia Act 1842

Status: Repealed

Text of statute as originally enacted

The South Australia Act 1834 (4 & 5 Will. 4. c. 95), or Foundation Act 1834 and also known as the South Australian Colonization Act, was an act of the Parliament of the United Kingdom which provided for the settlement of a province or multiple provinces on the lands between 132 degrees east and 141 degrees of east longitude, and between the Southern Ocean, and 26 degrees south latitude, including the islands adjacent to the coastline.

It also set up a London-based Board of the South Australian Colonization Commission allowing for three or more appointed commissioners (board members), known as the Colonization Commissioners for South Australia or, later, Colonisation Commissioners, to oversee the sale and leasing of land in South Australia to British subjects. This Board was to be represented in the new colony by a Resident Commissioner, Surveyor-General, an Emigration Agent and various other colonial officers.

In 1838, an amendment, which was referred to as the South Australia Government Act 1838, provided formal instructions for the establishment of the colony and, significantly, included acknowledgement of the rights of the Indigenous peoples in the area to be proclaimed as a colony.

The act was repealed by section 1 of the South Australia Act 1842 (5 & 6 Vict. c. 61), which instituted a different form of government for the colony, with the Governor presiding over an appointed Legislative Council, and established a commission to lay the foundations of a democratic form of government. The Commission was abolished in 1842 and its functions continued from early 1843 by the Colonial Land and Emigration Commission, which had been established by a Commission from Queen Victoria on 14 January 1840.

== Nomenclature ==
The full name of the act was "An Act to empower His Majesty to erect South Australia into a British Province or Provinces and to provide for the Colonization and Government thereof". (Note: The transcript as of 6 November 2019 misspells "colonization" as "colonisation" in the long name (as per the long name of the title in the actual document). Throughout the rest of the document, both transcript and original, it is spelt with a Z.) Its chapter number is 4 & 5 Will. 4. c. 95, meaning the 95th act that was passed in the reign of William IV, in the session of Parliament that started in the fourth year of his reign and finished in the fifth.

South Australia Act 1834 and Foundation Act 1834 were the official short titles of the act, which is also referred to in the literature as the South Australian Colonization Act.

== Background ==
Robert Gouger, who had edited Edward Gibbon Wakefield's Letter from Sydney (1829), had led a campaign to persuade the British government to help to bring about Wakefield's colonisation scheme. In 1831 the South Australian Land Company (SALC), which lobbied for a Royal Charter to establish a colony in Australia which would be administered by those who were developing the land in the colony, with the sales of the land financing assistance to certain categories of emigrants to the colony. Not getting government approval for a chartered colony, supporters then formed the South Australian Association in 1834, with a similar aim. Finally this resulted in the passage of the 1834 Act, although the provisions did not quite match up to those of their original scheme. The Duke of Wellington, Irish-born field marshal and statesman, and victor at Waterloo, has been credited with securing the passage of the act through the House of Lords.

The 1834 act set out the conditions for the establishment of the Province of South Australia, and granted authority for this to be done by the action of the King at a later date. By the means provided for in this act, South Australia would become the only colony whose establishment was authorised by an act of Parliament, and also incorporated unique features such as the requirement that it would be settled and developed at no cost to the United Kingdom.

In February 1836 King William IV signed the letters patent, signalling the final action needed to establish the province under this act. This act and the letters patent together achieved the founding of the colony, but with Wakefield's original plan failing to provide effective governance, having brought the colony to near-bankruptcy, a second act was enacted in 1842 to bring the colony under direct rule of the Crown.

== Provisions ==
The act recognised that these lands were inhabitable, and made provision for colonisation, government, and the funding of the new settlement on these lands. The act states that the land specified by the act is "waste" and "unoccupied". This statement was subsequently modified slightly by the Letters Patent establishing the Province of South Australia in 1836, which acknowledged some rights and occupation by Aboriginal people. (Note: The actual name of the colony, and its capital Adelaide, were given later. South Australia is a tautological place name (Australia being Latin for "southern land"), even though its territory was not the southernmost part of the Australian continent, nor of mainland Australia.)

The act specifically provided for a limited independence of Government, whereby all laws made by the government in South Australia were to be presented to the King-in-Council in the United Kingdom. The act defined the province of South Australia as being "...that part of Australia which lies between the meridians of the one hundred and thirty-second and one hundred and forty-first degrees of east longitude, and between the southern ocean and the twenty-six degrees of south latitude, together with all and every the islands adjacent thereto, and the bays and gulphs". However, the act gave control of the new colony to the Colonial Office as well as the Commissioners, which led to tension between the two and caused problems later.

The money raised by the sale and leasing of land constituted what was called an Emigration Fund which was to be applied to the cost of conveying further immigrants from Great Britain and Ireland, in equal proportions of men and women, under 30 years of age. The colony was to be convict-free. The act specified that those immigrating to South Australia, under the Emigration Fund, should be a married couple under the age of thirty, and that they both, along with any children they had, must immigrate to South Australia. The act also specifically forbade the transportation of convicts to South Australia.

The act allowed for three or more appointed Commissioners, called the "Colonization Commissioners for South Australia", to oversee the sale and leasing of land in South Australia to British subjects. The Commissioners were empowered by the act in a number of areas. They were able to appoint officers, delegate responsibilities, and make payment for the services provided. They were empowered to seek financing for the costs of starting the settlement. One method specifically prescribed in the act was for the issuing of bonds under the seal of the Commissioners in two separate and distinct areas. Firstly, they were able to issue what was named "South Australia public lands securities" up to a sum of 50,000 pounds. This financing was to pay for the cost of transporting immigrants, until the time when the funds from land sales was sufficient to cover the cost of transportation. Secondly, they were able to issue what was named "South Australian Colonial Revenue Securities", up to a sum of £200,000. This funding was a public debt on the colonial governance, which was to provide money for the operation of the settlement. It was to be repaid by the rates and taxes imposed on the colonists. The Commissioners were required to submit to Parliament once a year a full and detailed report of the proceedings in South Australia.

The act authorised the appointment of trustees, who would oversee a guarantee against the expense of settling South Australia, purchased out of the funds raised as South Australian Colonial Revenue Securities. This guarantee could be either Exchequer bills (banknotes) or other government securities in England. The amount was specified as £20,000.

The act provided for the establishment of local government, specifying that the local population should exceed 50,000 people.

The act allowed for the liquidation of public land, if at the end of a ten-year period, the population of the province or provinces had not reached 20,000 "natural born Subjects of His Majesty". This was to also repay any remaining debts of the South Australian Public Lands Securities.

The act further specified that the Province was to be self-sufficient; £20,000 surety had to be raised and invested in the government securities or Exchequer bills, and £35,000 worth of land had to be sold in the new colony before any settlement was permitted. These conditions were fulfilled by the close of 1835. The act specifies the minimum price of land at twelve shillings sterling per English acre, and for the selling price of land to be an equal price per acre, irrespective of the quality of the land.

=== South Australian Colonisation Commission ===
Under the act, the British government appointed the South Australian Colonization Commission to oversee its implementation: with thirteen members based in London, and a Resident Commissioner appointed by the board and stationed in the colony. Those first appointed, on 5 May 1835, were Colonel Robert Torrens (Chairman), Rowland Hill (Secretary), G. Barnes (Treasurer), George Fife Angas, Edward Barnard, William Hutt, J. G. Shaw-Lefevre, William Alexander Mackinnon M.P., Samuel Mills, Jacob Barrow Montefiore, Lt Col George Palmer, and John Wright, representing the Colonial Office.

Administrative power was divided between a Governor, John Hindmarsh, who represented the Crown, and the Resident Commissioner, who reported to the Colonisation Commissioners and who was responsible for the survey and sale of land as well as for organising migration and funding. The first Resident Commissioner was James Hurtle Fisher.

Robert Gouger was Colonial Secretary to the Commission, John Hindmarsh was appointed Governor and William Light Surveyor-General. The Commission was responsible for land sales and for land surveying, including choosing the site for the capital city. However, the act did not make clear the powers of the Commission vis-à-vis the Governor, which led to discord for some years.

== Regulations ==
=== Land sales ===
The Rules and Regulations for the Disposal of Public Lands in His Majesty's Province of South Australia, authored by the South Australian Commission in the UK in 1835, stipulated that surveys were to be undertaken and maps to be made available prior to sale of the land. Land could be bought at a uniform price per acre, but it would go to auction in the case of more than one potential buyer. Leases of up to three years could be granted "for pasturage" on unsold lands. All proceeds were to go to the Emigration Fund, set up to help poorer people to migrate to the colony. These regulations were of great significance; the success of the Wakefield scheme to populate and fund the new Province hinged on land development, so land law and regulations governing it were fundamental.

=== Letters Patent and Order-in-Council of 1836 ===
The 1836 Letters Patent and 1836 Order-in-Council clarified further how the new Province was to be established.

The "Letters Patent under the Great Seal of the United Kingdom erecting and establishing the Province of South Australia and fixing the boundaries thereof", short name Letters Patent establishing the Province of South Australia, dated 19 February 1836, was presented to King William IV to formally seek the approval to establish the Province of South Australia. The main change was to amend the wording in the 1834 document which referred to the land as "unoccupied", and offer recognition of the rights of the "Aboriginal Natives" to live unhindered within the lands of the Province of South Australia. The first migrant ship, the John Pirie, set sail for the colony three days later.

The Order-in-Council of 23 February 1836 (UK) established the legislative body to govern the new colony. It established a governing Council comprising the Governor, Chief Justice, Colonial Secretary, Advocate-General and the Resident Commissioner. The Council had broad legislative and executive powers, including setting rates, duties, and taxes. However only the Governor could propose laws, and these had to be approved by the King.

== Subsequent developments ==
South Australia Government Act 1838
- Act of Parliament
- Parliament of the United Kingdom
- Long title: An Act to amend an Act of the Fourth and Fifth Years of His late Majesty, empowering His Majesty to erect South Australia into a British Province or Provinces.
- Citation: 1 & 2 Vict. c. 60
- Territorial extent: United Kingdom

Dates
- Royal assent: 31 July 1838
- Commencement: 31 July 1838
- Repealed: 30 July 1842
Other legislation
Amends	South Australia Act 1834
Repealed by	South Australia Act 1842

Status: Repealed

Text of statute as originally enacted

On 31 July 1838, the changes were brought into law by the South Australia Government Act 1838 1 & 2 Vict. c. 60. This amendment to the original act increased the governor's power, combining his office with that of the Resident Commissioner. (This office fell to George Gawler from 17 October 1838).

=== Repeal ===
The South Australian Colonization Commission was abolished between 1840 and 1842 and the Colonial Land and Emigration Commission, which had been established by a Commission from Queen Victoria on 14 January 1840, took over its functions, but the amalgamation of the South Australian Colonization Commission with this body was not completed until early 1843. With the enactment of the 1842 act, the British Government assumed full control of South Australia as a Crown Colony.

== See also ==
- British colonisation of South Australia
- Terra nullius#Australia
