= Cadastral surveying =

Sub-field of land surveying specializing in demarcating real estate boundaries

Cadastral surveying is the sub-field of cadastre and surveying that specialises in the establishment and re-establishment of real property boundaries. It involves the physical delineation of property boundaries and determination of dimensions, areas and certain rights associated with properties. This is regardless of whether they are on land, water or defined by natural or artificial features. It is an important component of the legal creation of properties. A cadastral surveyor must apply both the spatial-measurement principles of general surveying and legal principles such as respect of neighboring titles.

== Duties and role of a cadastral surveyor ==
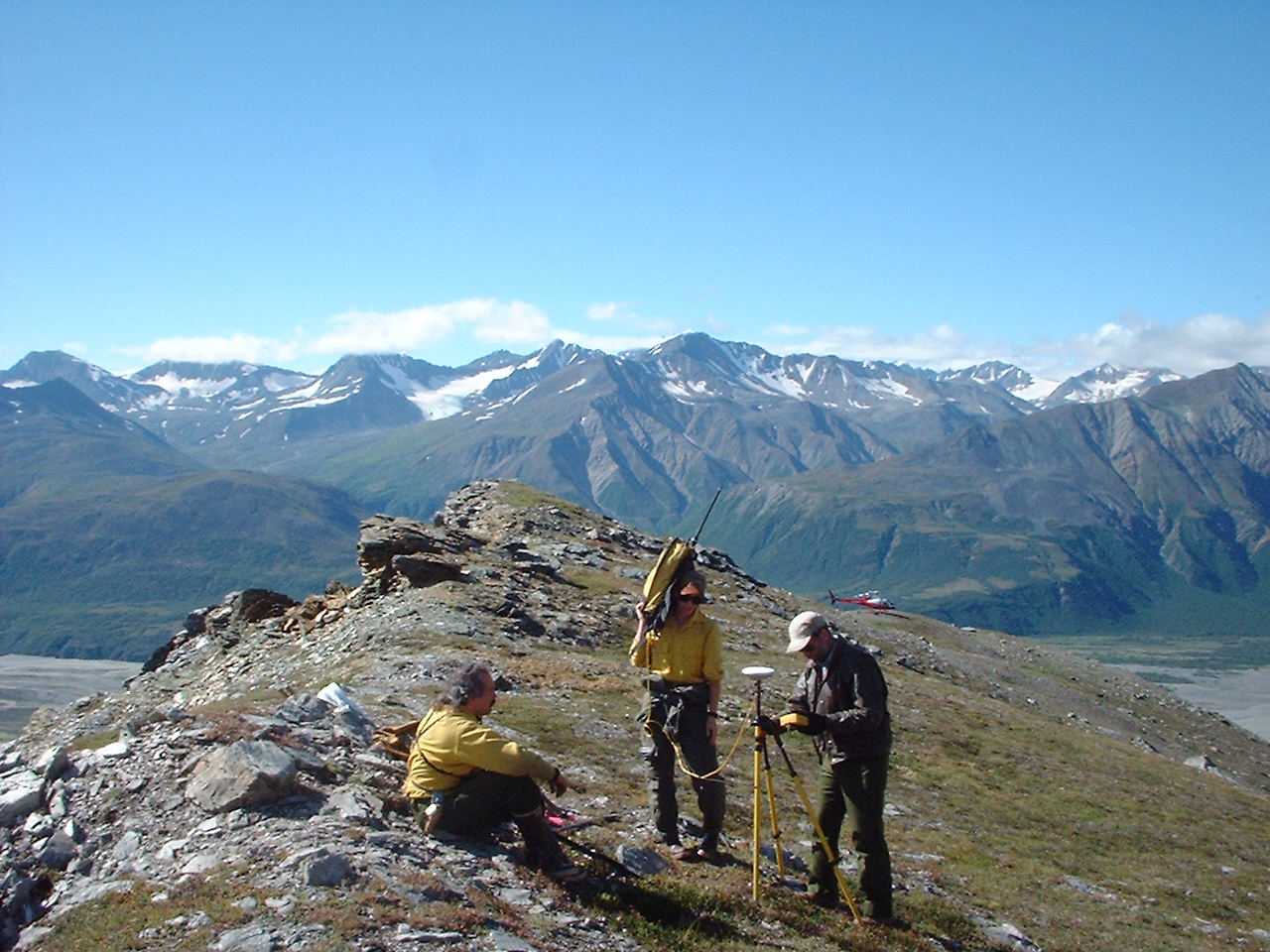
Cadastral surveyors in Alaska

A primary role of the land surveyor is to determine the boundary of real property on the ground. That boundary has usually already been established and described in legal documents and official plans and maps prepared by attorneys, engineers, and other land surveyors. The corners of the property will either already have been monumented by a prior surveyor, or will be monumented by the surveyor hired to perform a survey of a new boundary, one which has been agreed upon by adjoining landowners.

An equally important part of a cadastral surveyor’s role is the creation of regulatorily compliant survey records that become part of the cadastral framework. The details depend on jurisdiction, but typically involve preparing a plan of survey (or equivalent instrument) that encodes the boundary decisions that have been made, shows monuments, bearings, distances; and possibly easements, encroachments, and conflicts; all conforming to jurisdiction-specific standards.

In performing these roles, the surveyor is called on to not only measure and monument the boundary on the ground, but often to interpret documentary and other historical evidence, reconcile uncertainties and inconsistencies, and create physical and documentary artifacts that can survive decades of reinterpretation without the original surveyor or parties who established the boundary being present.

== Principles ==
A common use of a survey is to determine an existing legal property boundary. The first stage in such a survey, known as a resurvey, is to obtain copies of the deed description and all other available documents. The deed description is from a deed and not a tax statement or other incomplete document. The surveyor would also obtain copies of deed descriptions and maps of the adjoining properties, any records from the municipality or county, utility maps, and any records of surveys. Depending on which region the survey is located in, records may be incomplete or difficult to find. A thorough search is important so that no records are overlooked. Copies of deeds are usually in the government recorder's office, and maps or plats can usually be found at the recorder or surveyor's office. These arrangements will vary state-to-state and survey-system-to-survey system, so local familiarity is important.

When all the records are assembled, the surveyor examines the documents for errors, such as closure errors. When a metes and bounds description is involved, the seniority of the deeds must be determined. The title abstract may provide the order of seniority for the deeds related to the tract being surveyed. After this data is gathered and analyzed, the field survey may commence. The initial survey operations are concentrated on locating monuments. Property corners may be marked by iron pins, metal survey markers, iron pipes, and other features possibly establishing a line of possession will be located. When the approximate positions for the boundaries of the property have been located, a traverse is run around the property. While the control traverse is being run, ties will be measured and all details relevant to the boundaries will be acquired. This includes but is not limited to locating the property corners, monuments, fences, hedge rows, walls, walks, and buildings on the lot. The surveyor then takes this collected data and compares it to the records which were received. When a solution is reached, the chosen property corners (those that best fit all the data) are coordinated, and ties by direction and distance are computed from the nearest traverse point. Once this has been established the features on the lot can be drawn, dimensions can be shown from these features to the boundary line, and a map or plat is prepared for the client.

== Monuments ==
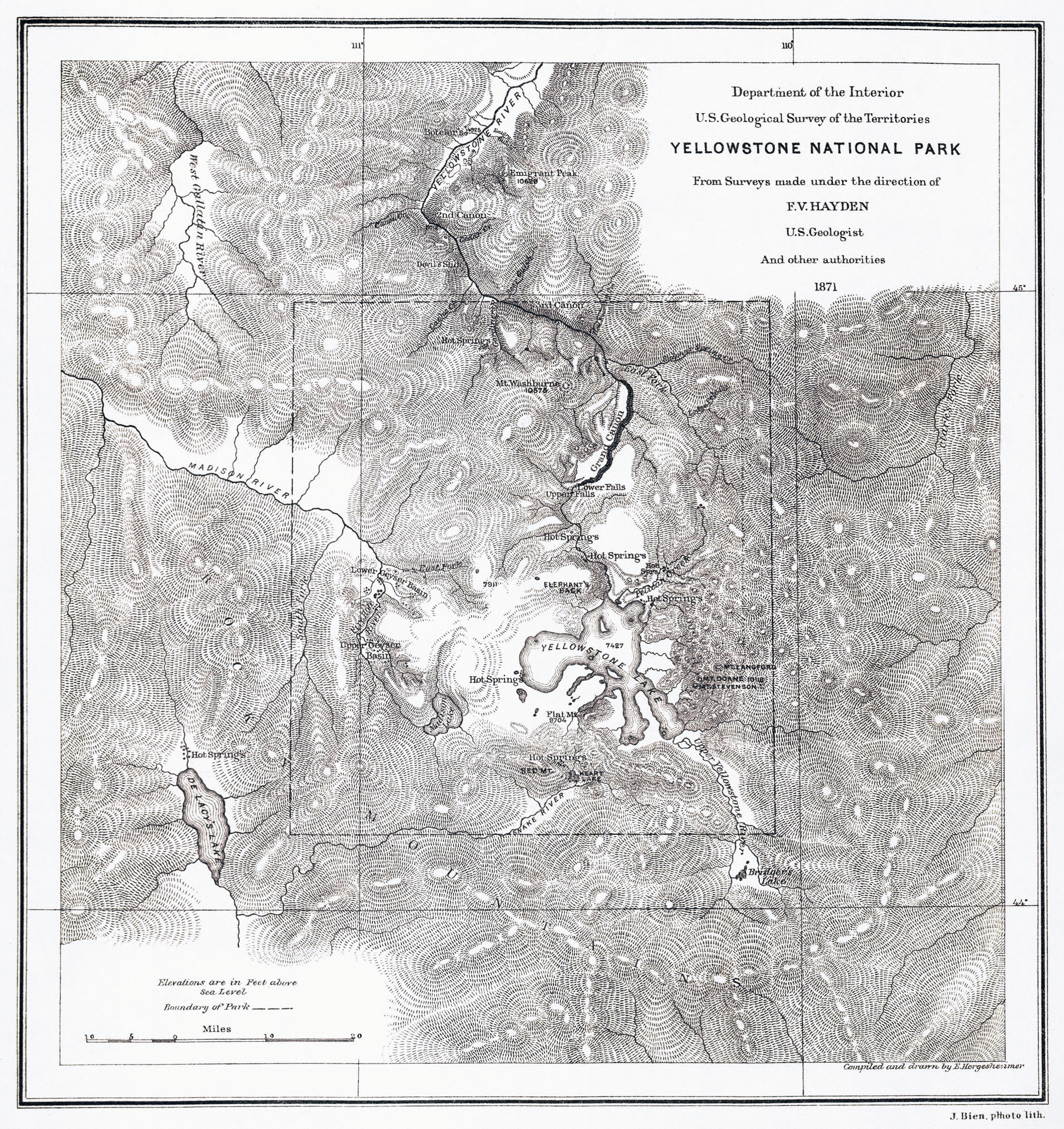
F. V. Hayden's map of Yellowstone National Park, 1871. His surveys were a significant basis for establishing the park in 1872.

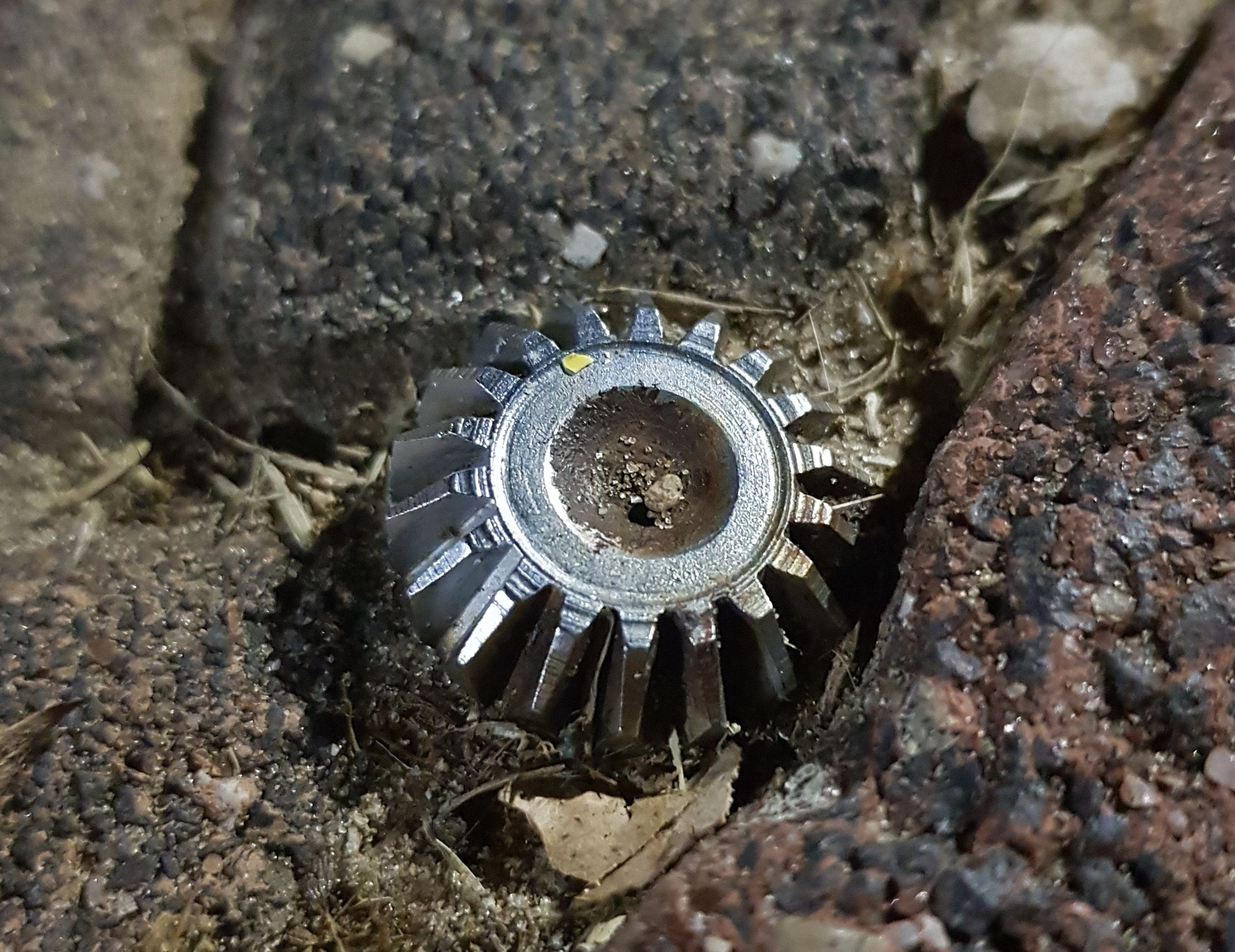
A cotton spindle spike in Tel Aviv pavement, used as a marker for public area cadastral surveying.

Cadastral survey monuments can be either natural or artificial. Natural monuments are things such as trees, large stones, and other substantial, naturally occurring objects that were in place before the survey was made and are very unlikely to be moved. An artificial monument is anything that (within local surveying regulations) serves to mark a property boundary—having been placed by landowners, surveyors, engineers, or others. They have included (but are not necessarily limited to) iron pins or pipes, stakes, and concrete monuments. US courts have held that natural monuments take precedence over artificial monuments, because they are more certain in identification and less likely to be disturbed.

Over time, construction and maintenance of roads and many other human acts, along with acts of nature such as earthquakes, movement of water, and tectonic shift, can obliterate or damage the monumented locations of land boundaries. The land surveyor is often compelled to consider other evidence such as fence locations, wood lines, monuments on neighboring properties, and people's recollections. These other forms of evidence are known as extrinsic evidence, and are fairly commonly used. Extrinsic evidence is defined as evidence outside the writings, in this case evidence outside of the deed. Extrinsic evidence has been held to be of equal value to evidence from another source.

A land surveyor sets monuments at actual physical points on the ground that define angle points of boundary lines dividing neighboring land parcels. These monuments may be iron rebar rods or pipes, but they vary by local regulations. Rods or pipes may have an affixed plastic cap over the top bearing the responsible surveyor's name and license number. Older monuments may exist such as old pipes, gun barrels, axles, mounds of stone, whiskey bottles, or even wooden stakes. In addition to rods and pipes, surveyors might use 4 inch × 4 inch concrete posts at the corners of large parcels or anywhere which requires greater stability (e.g. beach sand).

== See also ==
- Cadastre#Surveys
- Surveying#Cadastral
