= Self-governing colony =

Type of British colony with its own elected government

In the British Empire, a self-governing colony was a colony with responsible government in which the Executive Council was appointed from the majority in the elected Legislative Assembly. This gave the colony nearly full internal autonomy while reserving control of foreign and defence policy, for the most part, to London. This was in contrast to a Crown colony, in which the British Government ruled directly via an appointed Governor, with or without the assistance of an appointed Council.

Self-governing colonies for the most part had no formal authority over constitutional matters such as the monarchy and the constitutional relationship with the United Kingdom. The Judicial Committee of the Privy Council in London serves as the ultimate avenue of appeal in matters of law and justice.

Colonies have sometimes been referred to as "self-governing" in situations where the executive has been under the control of neither the imperial government nor a local legislature elected by universal suffrage but by a local oligarchy. In most cases such control had been exercised by a ruling class from a settler community.

In 1983, the then-remaining British colonies, self-governing (notably Bermuda) or Crown (notably Hong Kong), were re-designated as British Dependent Territories, and in 2002 as British Overseas Territories.

== History ==
=== North America (1619–1949) ===
The term "self-governing colony" has sometimes been used in relation to the direct rule of a Crown colony by an executive governor, elected under a limited franchise, such as the Massachusetts Bay Colony between 1630 and 1684.

The first local legislatures raised in the English overseas possessions were the House of Burgesses of Virginia (1619) and the House of Assembly of Bermuda (1620), originally part of Virginia. The Parliament of Bermuda, which now also includes a Senate, is the third-oldest in the Commonwealth of Nations, after the Tynwald and Westminster (currently the Parliament of the United Kingdom). Of the three, only Bermuda's has legislated continuously, with the Royalist camp maintaining control of the archipelago during the Commonwealth of England and the Protectorate.

However, in the modern sense of the term, the first self-governing colony is generally considered to have been the Province of Canada, in 1841; the colony gained responsible government in 1849. All the colonies of British North America became self-governing between 1848 and 1855, except the Colony of Vancouver Island. Nova Scotia was the first colony to achieve responsible government in January–February 1848 through the efforts of Joseph Howe, followed by the Province of Canada later that year. They were followed by Prince Edward Island in 1851, New Brunswick, and Newfoundland in 1855 under Philip Francis Little. These colonies were federated as a dominion in stages between 1867 and 1873, except for Newfoundland, which remained a separate self-governing colony, was a separate dominion from 1907 to 1949 and joined Canada in 1949. However, the term "self-governing colony" is not widely used by Canadian constitutional experts.

=== Australia and Oceania (1852–1907) ===
In Australia, the term self-governing colony is widely used by historians and constitutional lawyers in relation to the political arrangements in the British settler colonies of Australasia — New South Wales, Queensland, South Australia, Tasmania, Victoria and Western Australia — between 1852 and 1901, when the six colonies agreed to Federation and became a Dominion.

In 1852, the British Parliament passed The New Zealand Constitution Act, paving the way for a central New Zealand government with an elected General Assembly (Parliament) and six provincial governments. The General Assembly first met in 1854. Provincial governments were abolished in 1877. New Zealand had the option in 1901 of becoming a state within the new Australian Federation, but there was major opposition to the idea. In 1907, New Zealand gained the status of Dominion.

=== Southern Africa (1852–1980) ===
In southern Africa, the Cape Colony was granted representative government in 1852, followed by responsible government in 1872. Natal became self-governing in 1893, Transvaal in 1906 and Orange River Colony in 1908. These four colonies were united as a unitary Dominion, the Union of South Africa, in 1910. Southern Rhodesia (later Zimbabwe), became a self-governing colony in 1923.

=== Europe (1921–1964) ===
Malta was also a self-governing colony between 1921 and 1933, 1947 and 1958, and 1962 until independence two years later.

=== Dominions/Commonwealth realms ===
Dominions were self-governing entities during the mid-to-late-19th century and early 20th century, with much more autonomy than self-governing colonies. In the Dominions, prior to the Statute of Westminster in 1931, a Governor General, officially the monarch's representative, was an officer of the British government.

After the agreement on the Balfour Declaration 1926 and the Statute of Westminster 1931, the Dominions were recognized as equal to the United Kingdom. After that time, the Dominions were largely free to act in matters of defence and foreign affairs, if they so chose and "Dominion" gradually acquired a new meaning: a state which was independent of Britain, but which shared the British monarch as the official head of state. The term Dominion has since largely fallen out of use and been replaced with the term Realm.

=== Modern times (1981–present) ===
In 1981, under the British Nationality Act 1981 and reflecting the change in status toward devolved self-government (and depriving colonials of the rights of abode and work in the United Kingdom), self-governing and Crown colonies were renamed "British Dependent Territories". This terminology caused offence to both loyalists and nationalists in the territories and was changed in 2002, by the means of the British Overseas Territories Act 2002, to British Overseas Territories.

== See also ==
- Autonomy
- Crown colony
- Dominion
- Dutch Caribbean
- Overseas collectivity
