= Currie Street =

Street in Adelaide, South Australia

Currie Street South Australia
- Currie Street looking east, 2026
- Coordinates: 34.924878°S 138.587519°E (West end); 34.924344°S 138.599625°E (East end)

General information
- Type: Street
- Location: Adelaide city centre
- Length: 1.1 km (0.7 mi)
- Opened: 1837

Major junctions
- West end: Glover Avenue; Adelaide
- West Terrace; Light Square; Morphett Street
- East end: King William Street; Adelaide

Location(s)
- LGA(s): City of Adelaide

Currie Street is a main street in the Adelaide city centre, South Australia. It runs east–to–west from King William Street, through Light Square, to West Terrace on the western edge of the city centre.

== History ==
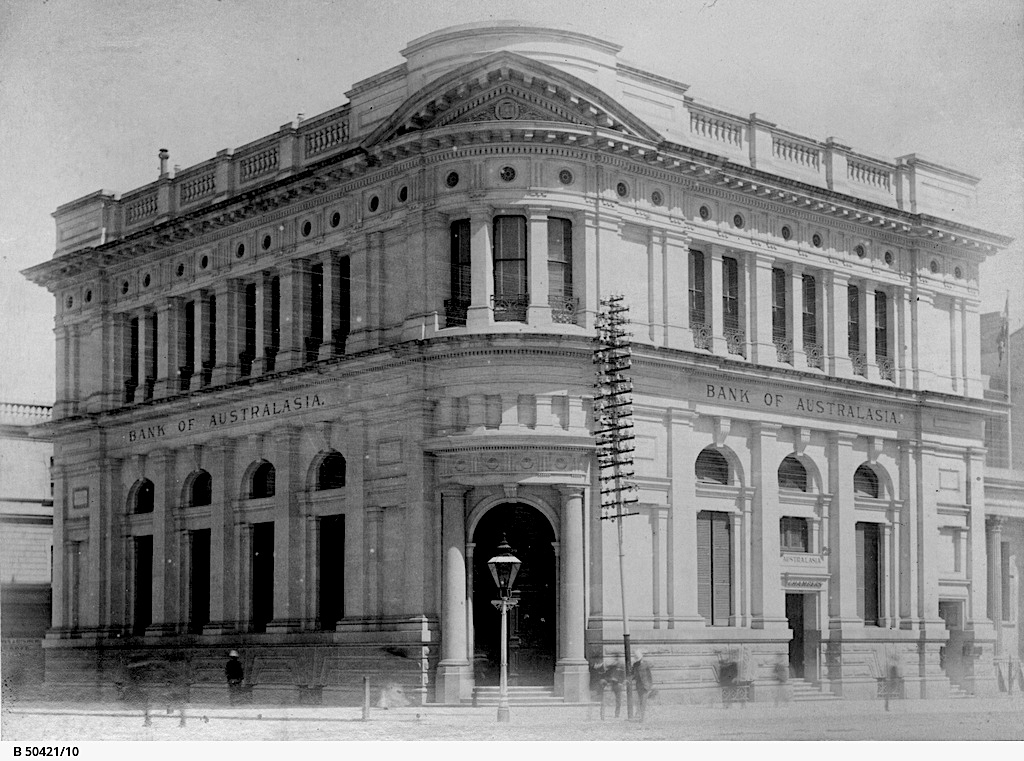
Bank of Australasia situated on the corner of Currie and King William Street, demolished in 1968.

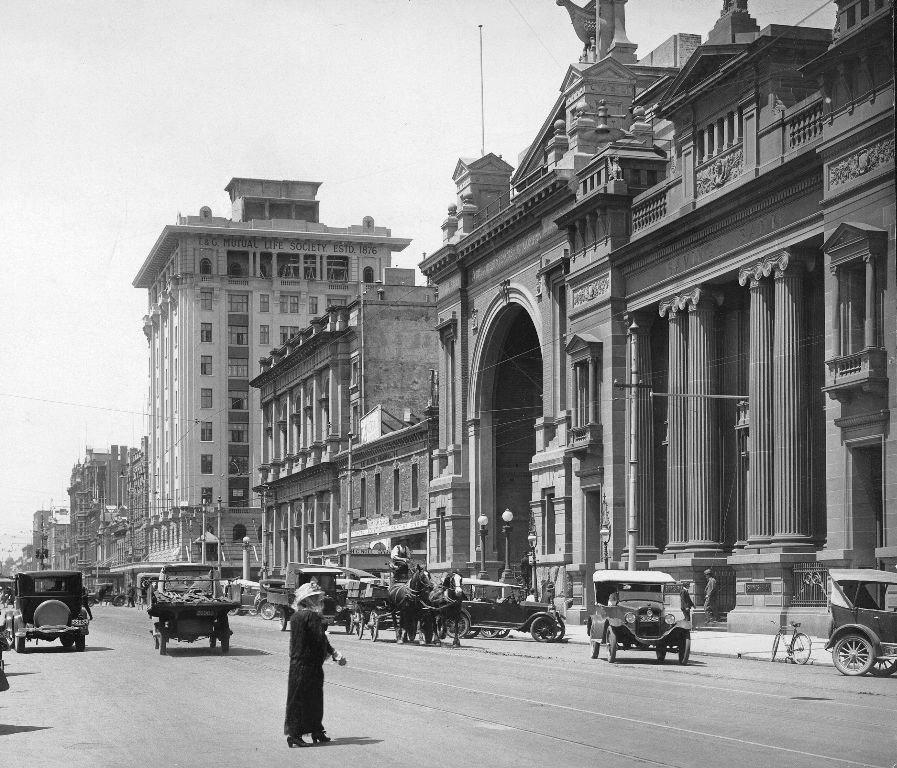
Currie Street looking east, c. 1925

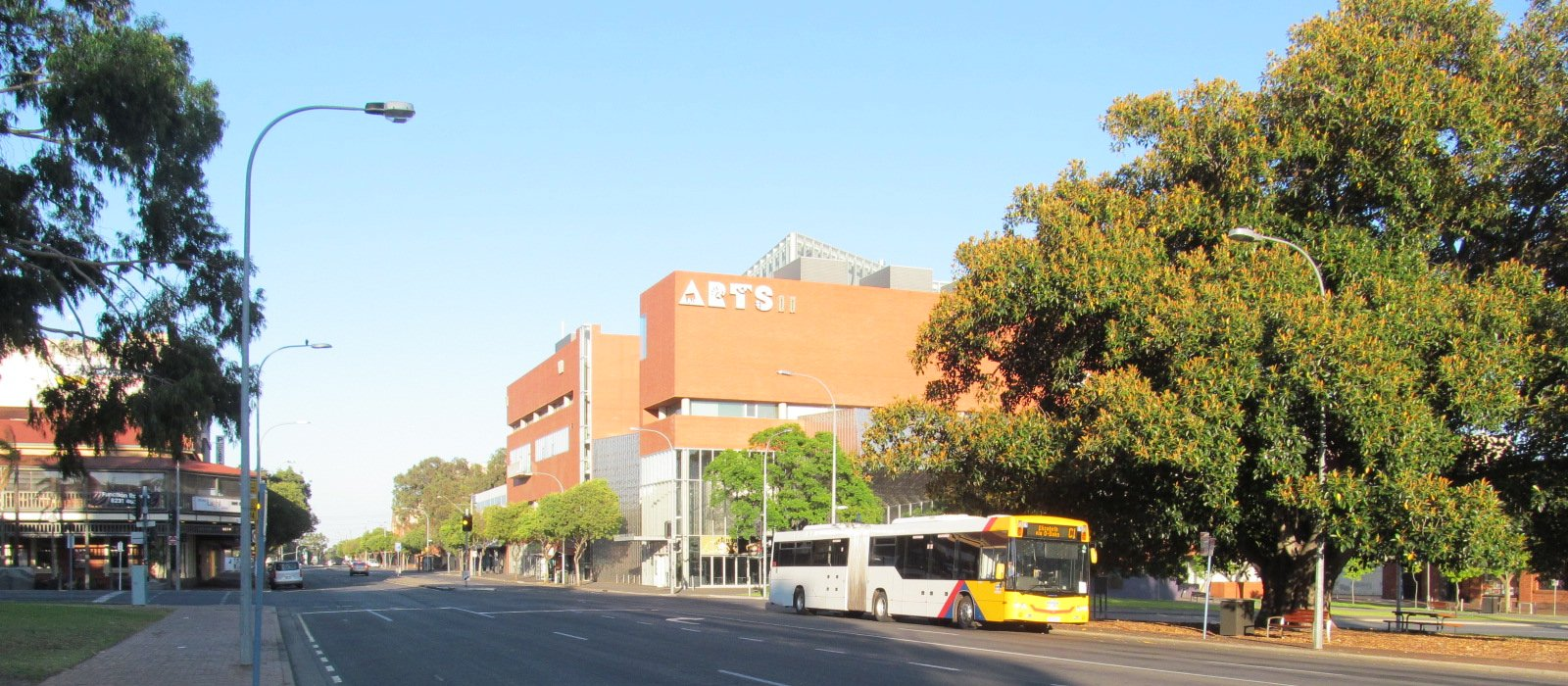
Currie Street, looking northwest from Light Square, January 2012

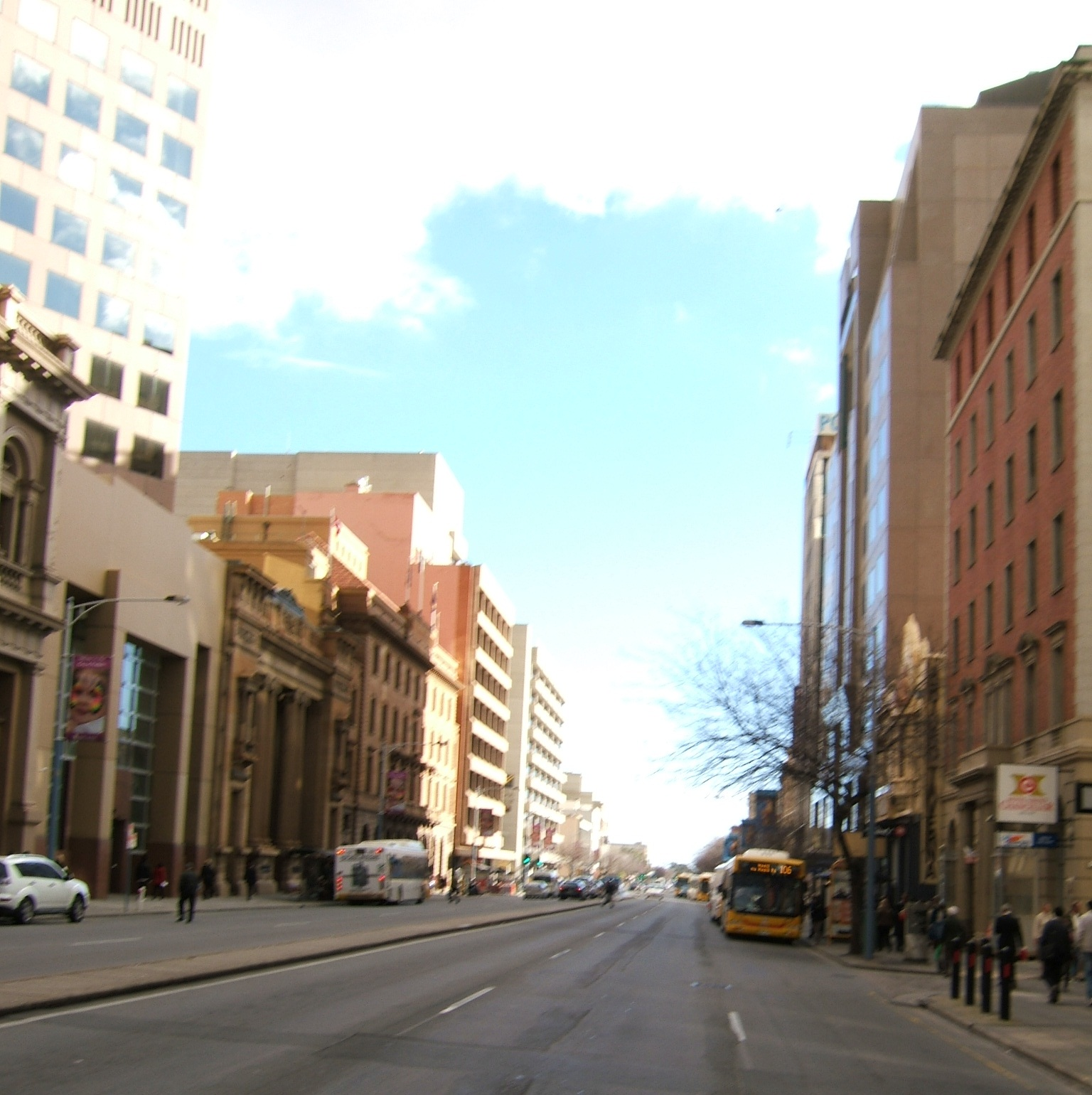
Currie Street, looking west from King William Street

The street was named after British MP Raikes Currie (1801–1881), a founder of the South Australian Company and treasurer of the South Australian Church Society. The street was named after Currie by the Street Naming Committee in 1837.

English benefactor William Augustine Leigh (1802–1873), who bought many parcels of land in South Australia through his agent Sir John Morphett, bought two town acres between Currie and Hindley Streets. Hence the naming of Leigh Street, a now pedestrianised street between the two, and a popular dining precinct.

Thomas Topham Petheridge, of Plymouth, was a land grantee of Town acre 138 on Currie Street's south side, and of Town acre 176 on Waymouth Street's north side. Topham Street, now closed, which ran between Currie and Waymouth Streets over the land granted to Petheridge, was named eponymously. The street is now the site of Topham Mall.

The Currie Street Model School, one of four "model schools" in the city centre, was established in 1893.

In July 2012, bus lanes were introduced along the full length of Currie Street.

== Continuing east and west ==
=== Glover Avenue ===
The street changes its name to Glover Avenue at West Terrace. It continues west through the Adelaide Park Lands and Bakewell Underpass. Glover Avenue was opened in 1925 and was named after the previous Lord Mayor of Adelaide, Charles Richmond Glover. The Bakewell underpass opened in 2008. It replaced the Bakewell Bridge which opened with Glover Avenue in 1925. The Bakewell Bridge was named after Edward Bakewell, the chairman of the Municipal Tramways Trust.

The purpose of the Bakewell Bridge was to reduce motor vehicle and tram traffic congestion on limited routes between the western suburbs and the Adelaide city centre. Glover Avenue and the Bakewell Bridge replaced a level crossing and Henley Beach Road crossing the parklands on a different alignment. The bridge carried tram and motor traffic over some busy railway lines. The trams were removed in the 1950s.

The bridge continued in use until it was in need of replacement. It was demolished in 2006. The bridge was replaced by the Bakewell Underpass which continued under James Congdon Drive to provide a grade-separated intersection. It opened for traffic in January 2008.

=== Henley Beach Road ===
It then changes name to Henley Beach Road as it continues through the western suburbs to the seaside, terminating at Henley Beach South.

Prior to construction of Glover Avenue in 1925, Henley Beach Road did not align to Currie Street. Glover Street veers right (north) from Currie Street. Prior to its construction, Henley Beach Road crossed the railway at a level crossing and continued as Mile End Road straight across the Adelaide Park Lands to align with Hindley Street. The tram line followed North Terrace and the first part of Port Road on the bridge over the railway, then swung south to join Henley Beach Road.

=== Grenfell Street ===
On the east side of King William Street, it changes name to Grenfell Street. A common belief for the name change that happens at King William Street with Grenfell/Currie St is that the namers believed no one should be able to cross the King's path. This applies to all streets that meet King William Street.

== Notable buildings ==
=== Queen's Theatre ===
The Queen's Theatre, on Playhouse Lane and connected to Currie Street by Gilles Arcade, is the oldest theatre in mainland Australia. Built in 1840, the façade dates from 1850. The building has had a number of uses:

- 1840–1842 Queen's Theatre & Shakespeare Tavern
- 1843–1850 Supreme Court & Temple Tavern
- 1850–1868 Royal Victoria Theatre & Theatre Tavern
- 1877–1928 Horse and Carriage Bazaar
- 1928–1988 Car park and light industry

The building is now owned by Arts South Australia. After a partial restoration in the 1990s, is now used as a performance space and function venue.

=== Edinburgh Castle ===
The Edinburgh Castle Hotel, referred to colloquially as the Ed Castle, or The Ed, was a pub located at 233-239 Currie Street, on the corner of Currie and Gray Streets. It was opened in 1837, making it the longest trading licensed premises in Adelaide city centre, and became a popular venue for live music.

The building was locally heritage-listed on 27 March 2013, under the following criteria:

- Criteria A: it displays historical, economic or social themes that are of importance to the local area
- Criteria E: it is associated with a notable local personality or event
- Criteria F: it is a notable landmark in the area

Known for its popularity as a live music venue and beer garden, the pub was forced to in September 2018, owing to construction of a new student accommodation tower block and roadworks. Tony Bond, who previously ran Gallery 139 on Magill Road, said that turnover had decreased from $1.1million over the period November 2016 to June 2017 to $760,000 over the same period the following year, and the business could not be sustained.

After reopening after a major renovation under new management on 15 December 2023, and live music resumed at the venue on 2 February 2024. However, the business once again closed on 12 February 2024.

In March 2025 it was announced that the Crown & Anchor would be temporarily relocated from its location in Grenfell Street to the Ed Castle from July 2025 for two years, to allow construction to take place on the adjoining site in Grenfell Street. The Crown & Anchor team and music programme would go with the move.
