= Pascoe St Leger Grenfell =

British businessman

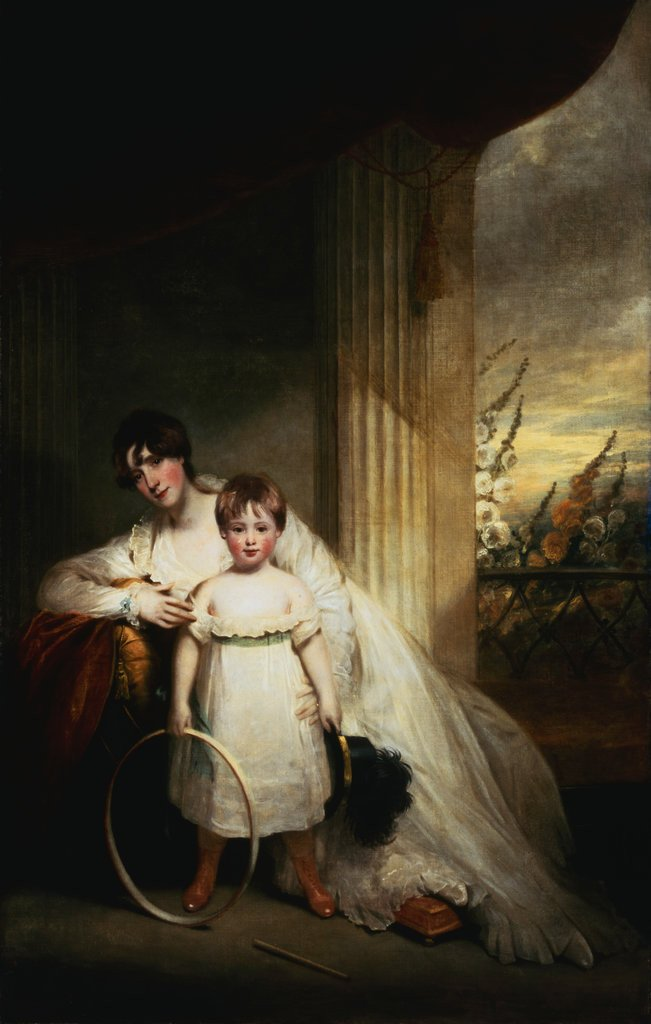
- A portrait of Grenfell (right) by John Hoppner
- Born: 5 November 1798; London
- Died: 27 March 1879 (aged 80); Nottingham
- Education: Eton College
- Occupations: Businessman, patron
- Known for: Grenfell Street, Adelaide
- Children: 9 including Francis Grenfell, 1st Baron Grenfell
- Parents: Pascoe Grenfell (father); Georgiana St Leger (mother)

Pascoe St Leger Grenfell (5 November 1798 – 27 March 1879) was a British businessman who was a key backer of the South Australian Company. He was a committee member of the South Australian Church Society, and is known for donation of an acre of land on North Terrace, Adelaide which was used for the construction of the Holy Trinity Church — one of the first churches built in the city and the colony. He also donated 40 acres of land for the use of the church as glebe lands. This land later became the suburb of Trinity Gardens. Grenfell Street, Adelaide was named after him.

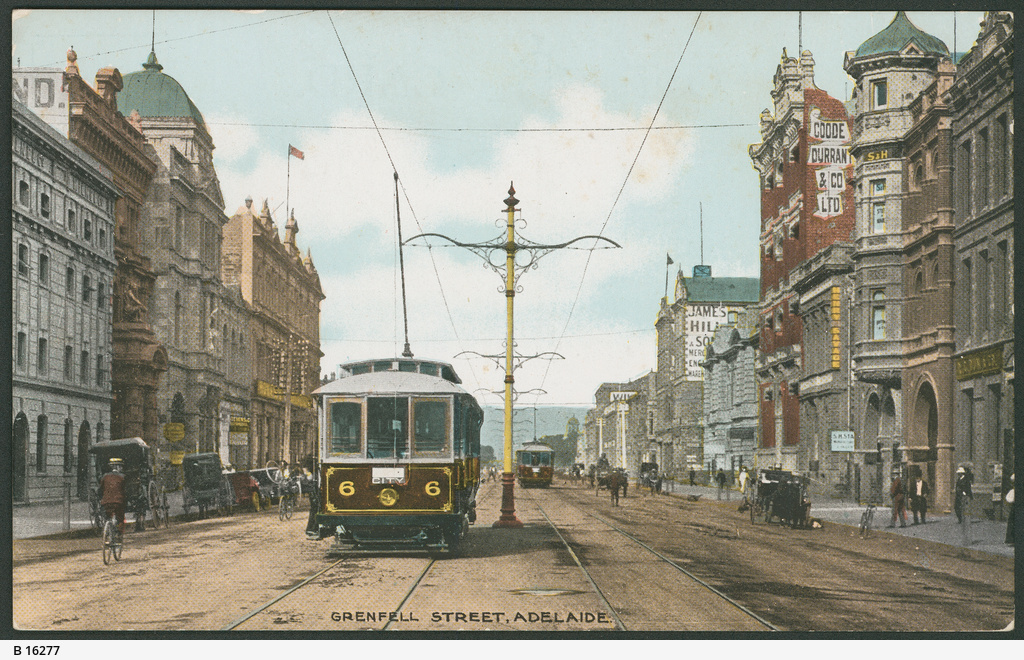
Grenfell Street, Adelaide, Australia circa 1910

== Biography ==
Pascoe St Leger was the second son of Pascoe Grenfell (1761–1838) and Georgiana St Leger and grandson of Pascoe Grenfell (1729–1810) and St Leger St Leger, 1st Viscount Doneraile. He was born in London and educated at Eton College.

He married twice, having nine children by his first wife, including Francis Grenfell, 1st Baron Grenfell. He was the grandfather of the politician Cecil Alfred Grenfell and the soldier Francis Octavius Grenfell, the great-grandfather of the courtier Frances Campbell-Preston and the great-great-grandfather of the politician William Waldegrave.

Following the death of his father in 1838, Grenfell took control of Pascoe Grenfell & Sons, his father's and grandfather's copper and tin smelting businesses on the River Tawe in Swansea, Wales. On the abolition of slavery by Britain in 1833, Grenfell applied for compensation for the 347 slaves he owned in Jamaica. Grenfell was awarded £4121 (equivalent to £494,001 in 2023) in compensation for 216 slaves at the Hazelymph estate in St James, Jamaica and unsuccessful in his claim for 131 slaves at St Elizabeth estate, also in Jamaica.

He died in Nottingham, and was buried in the family vault in Taplow Court, Buckinghamshire.

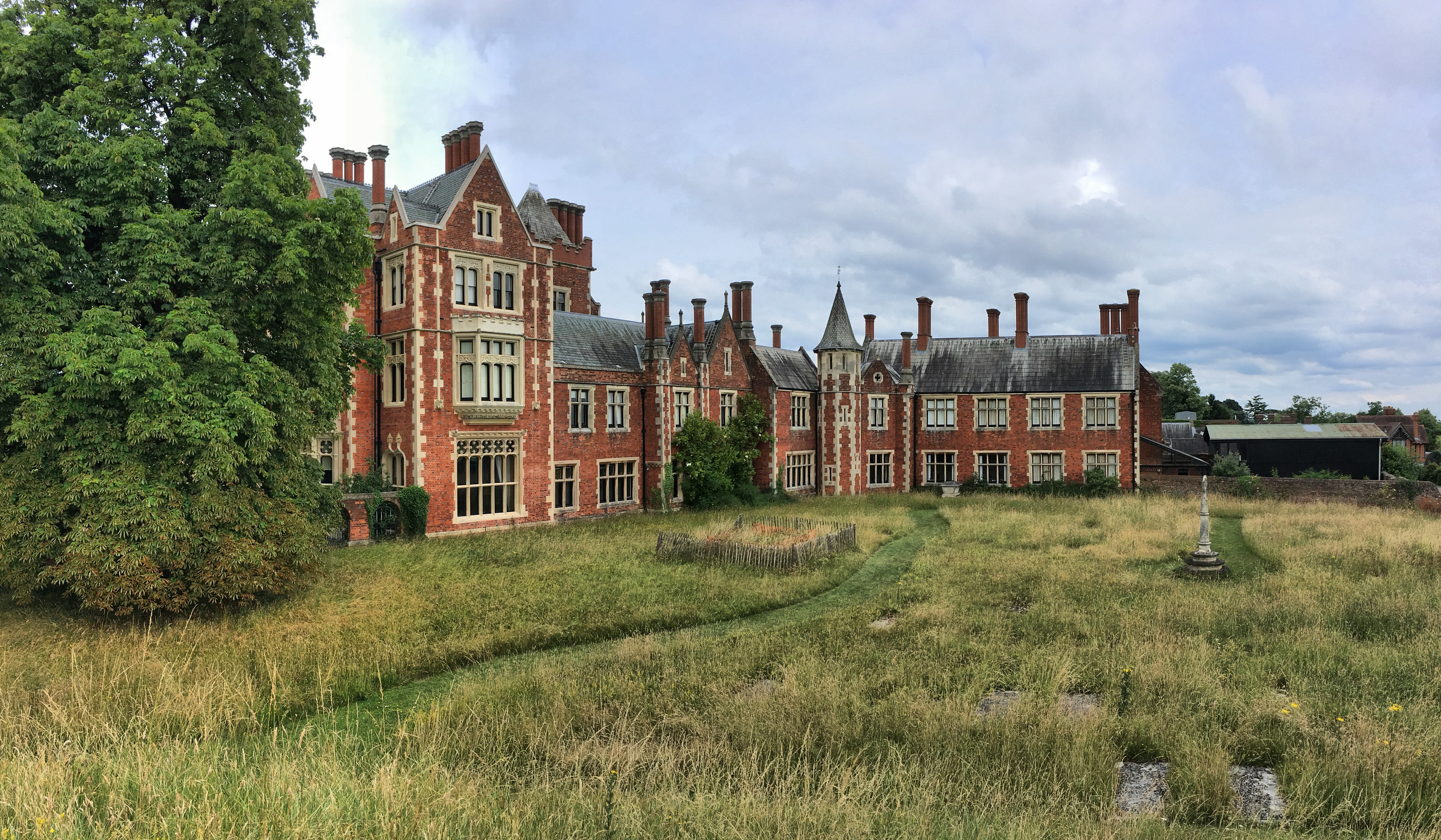
Taplow Court, Buckinghamshire

== South Australian Church Society ==
Grenfell with South Australian Company Director Raikes Currie, William Wolryche-Whitmore and Reverend Sir Henry Robert Dukinfield were key committee members of the Society for the Propagation of the Gospel in Foreign Parts (SPG) and were all involved with the establishment of South Australia as a free colony.

In the mid 1830s Grenfell was involved with the South Australian Church Society, an organisation primed to generate funds for the construction of churches and employ ministers in the new colony of South Australia. Colonel William Light, the Surveyor General of the new colony and the City of Adelaide, had authority to select land for the South Australian Church Society. He selected the site where Holy Trinity Church stands on North Terrace. Pascoe St Leger Grenfell transferred Town Acre No. 9 (order no. 171) for the building of the Holy Trinity Church, Adelaide and 40 acres of country land for 'glebe' lands in an area that later became the suburb Trinity Gardens. Grenfell had purchased the land in December 1835 for 12 shillings but by March 1836 had donated it for the church. The entire donation had an estimated value of 70 shillings and made him the largest private contributor to the venture.

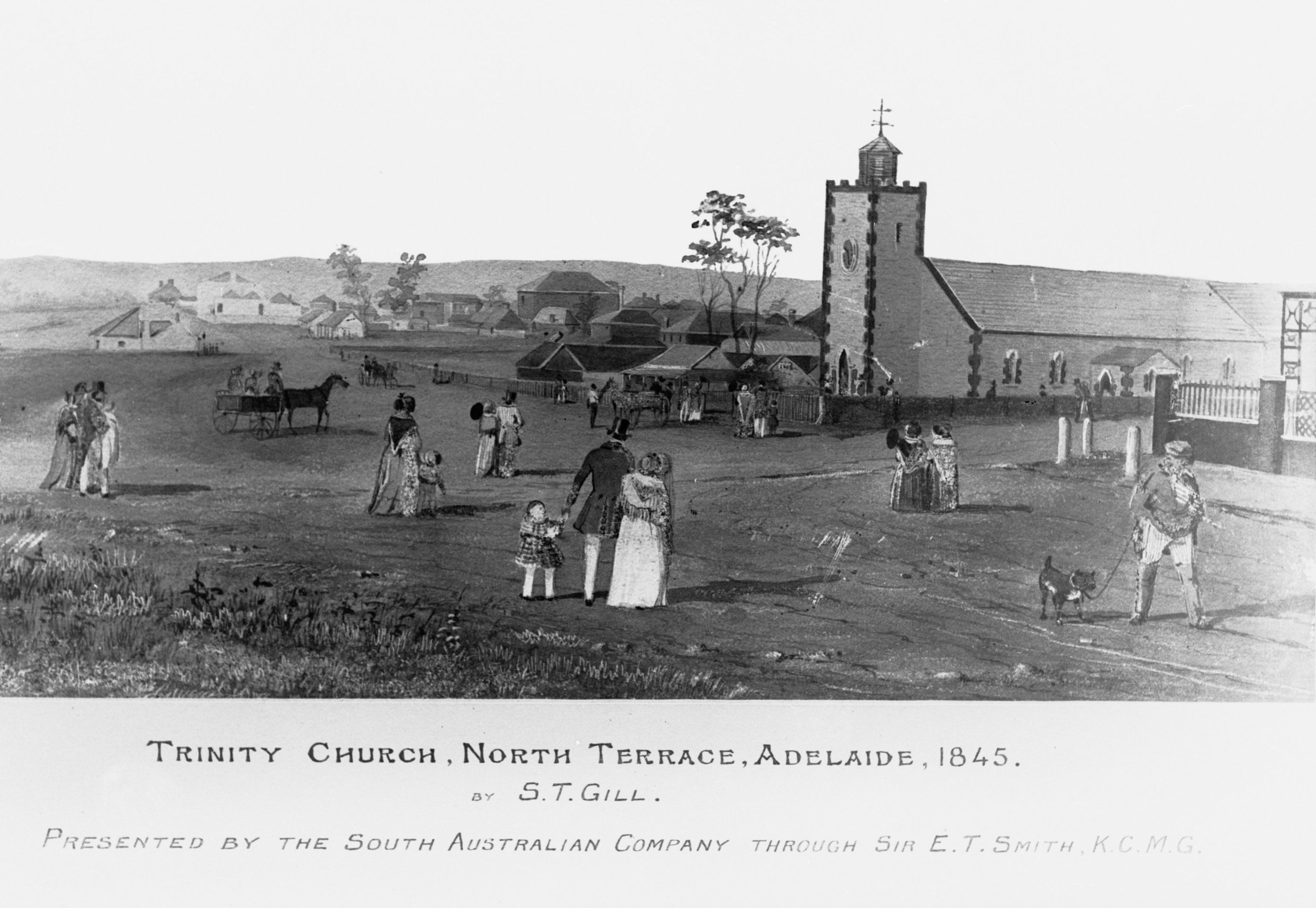
Holy Trinity Church, Adelaide, 1845 (painting by S.T. Gill)

== See also ==
- City of Adelaide
- Adelaide city centre
- Street Naming Committee
- Raikes Currie
