= South Australian Company =

Company involved in colonisation of South Australia

- Type: Private
- Industry: Conglomerate
- Founded: 9th, October 1835
- Founder: George Fife Angas
- Defunct: 17th, March 1949
- Fate: Liquidated by Elders Trustee & Executor Company Ltd

The South Australian Company, also referred to as the South Australia Company, was formed in London on 9 October 1835, after the South Australia (Foundation) Act 1834 had established the new British Province of South Australia, with the South Australian Colonization Commission set up to oversee implementation of the Act.

The South Australian Company was a commercial enterprise, and not officially connected to the British Government or the Colonization Commission, but turned out to be indispensable in allowing emigration to the new colony to begin. The founding board of the company, headed by George Fife Angas, consisted of wealthy British merchants, with the purpose of developing a new settlement in South Australia, building a new colony by meeting an essential financial obligations of the South Australia Act 1834. It bought up unsold land to the level required by the Act for emigration to be allowed to begin.

During the first years of settlement, the company built a great deal of infrastructure and contributed to the creation of industries such as fishing and mining, and it continued to play an important part in the business affairs of the colony (and later state) of South Australia for over a hundred years. It ended business in its own right on 17 March 1949, when it was liquidated by Elders Trustee & Executor Company Ltd. Many streets in Adelaide were named after men associated with the company.

== Background ==
The South Australian Association (1833–1834) had lobbied the British Government for years to set up a new colony in southern Australia. The members of the Association were men of varied backgrounds, from philanthropists to merchants, including Edward Gibbon Wakefield, Robert Gouger, Robert Torrens Sr and George Fife Angas. The association underwent numerous negotiations and submitted and resubmitted many plans, until the British Parliament finally gave approval and passed the South Australia Act 1834 on 15 August 1834. The association's original plan was for the colony to be more or less independent, but the government thought otherwise; a governor would represent the Crown (British Government), and would share administration of the new colony with the London-based South Australian Colonization Commission, which would be represented in the colony by a resident commissioner, surveyor-general, and various other officers. The new Act also required that a certain amount of land had to be sold in the colony before anybody was allowed to emigrate.

== History of the company ==
=== Foundation ===
George Fife Angas, after resigning from the association, offered to set up a company to buy up the remaining unsold land, which was agreed by the Colonisation Commissioners, so long as this new company, the South Australian Company, did not attempt to set up monopolies in the colony.

The founding Board of Directors of the South Australian Company, established on 9 October 1835, were Angas as chairman; Raikes Currie; Charles Hindley MP; James Hyde; Henry Kingscote; John Pirie, Alderman; Christopher Rawson; John Rundle MP; Thomas Smith; James Ruddell Todd; and Henry Waymouth; with Edmund John Wheeler (Manager); Samuel Stephens, (Colonial Manager); and Edward Hill (Secretary pro tem).

The original purpose of the company was to help prospective colonists meet the obligations set out in the South Australia Act 1834. The United Kingdom did not want the "province" to be a financial burden, like other colonies, and imposed certain conditions through the Act. One of these conditions was the sale of real property (land) to the value of £35,000. Each director was required to buy at least £2,500 in shares in the company. The biggest sales in land carried out by the company were done in the names of Angas, who purchased 102 lots of land of 135 acres (55 ha) on behalf of the company, which included prime real estate in both town and country, totalling 13,770 acres (5,570 ha), and with the right to rent an additional 220,160 acres (89,100 ha) of pasturage (worth £40,000), and the Currie family, who purchased £9,000. Research published in 2018 and 2019 concluded that these sales and the creation of company, which secured the establishment of South Australia, link the colony's creation with slavery in the British West Indies.

It was this purchase of land that enabled emigration to commence. It was purely a commercial venture, but without it, the colonisation plan would not have come to fruition.

=== First Fleet of South Australia (1836) ===
After a historic meeting at Exeter Hall on 30 June 1834, where the principles, objects, plan and prospects of the new Colony of South Australia were explained to the public, hundreds of enquiries from prospective emigrants arrived at the South Australian Association's headquarters in London.

In January 1836 four ships sailed from England on behalf of the company, ahead of the Colonisation Commission's planned expedition. They developed a settlement at Kingscote on Kangaroo Island, in July 1836, but when farming proved unviable, both the settlement and the company's operations were moved to the mainland. The company provided basic infrastructure for the new colony and sold or leased land to immigrants who came to settle.

Over the course of six months, nine ships, which may be termed the First Fleet of South Australia, arrived in the new colony:

Date	Ship	Size	Purpose	Passengers
27 July	Duke of York	(190 tons)	S.A. Company	38 passengers
30 July	Lady Mary Pelham	(206 tons)	S.A. Company	29
16 August	John Pirie	(105 tons)	S.A. Company	28
21 August	Rapid	(162 tons)	Commissioners	24
11 September	Cygnet	(239 tons)	Commissioners	84
5 October	Emma	(181 tons)	S.A. Company	22
2 November	Africaine	(316 tons)	Various	76
20 November	Tam O'Shanter	(360 tons)	O. Gilles	74
23 December	HMS Buffalo	(850 tons)	Commissioners	171

=== Post-settlement ===
During the first years of settlement, the company undertook the construction of a great deal of infrastructure: roads, bridges, mills, wharfs and warehouses. It contributed to the creation of the whaling, fishing and shipbuilding industries and encouraged mineral exploration. The company, for instance, owned four whaling vessels.

There was, however, a financial slump, or Depression, in the 1840s, and company dividends were unable to be paid out until 1848, after copper was discovered at Burra.

The company continued to be an important part of the business affairs of Adelaide and the colony (later state) for over a hundred years.

From 1872, the South Australian Company occupied offices on North Terrace on the corner of Gawler Place. The new building, "Gawler Chambers", was completed in 1914.

It was wound up on 17 March 1949, with the management of its remaining business transferred to Elders Trustee & Executor Company Ltd.

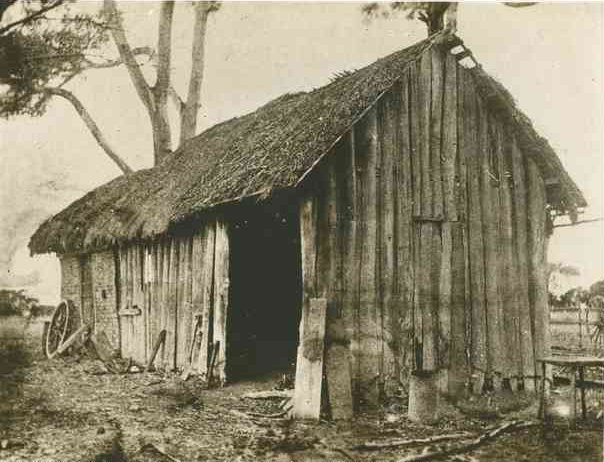
First office, erected 1836 at Kingscote, Kangaroo Island. (c. 1870)

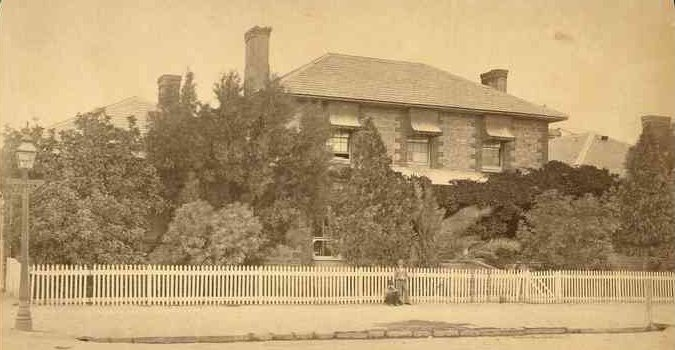
Office on North Terrace East, corner of Gawler Place. (c. 1872)

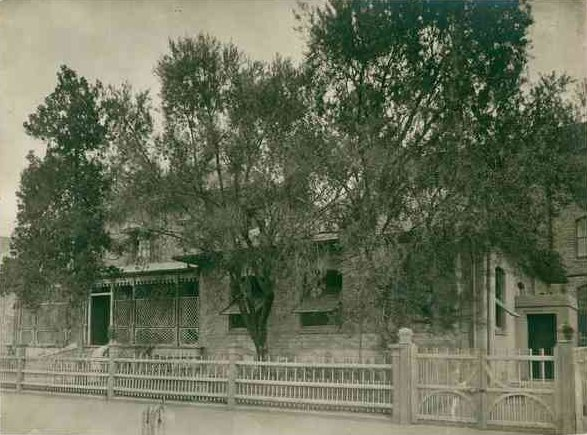
Company office c. 1900

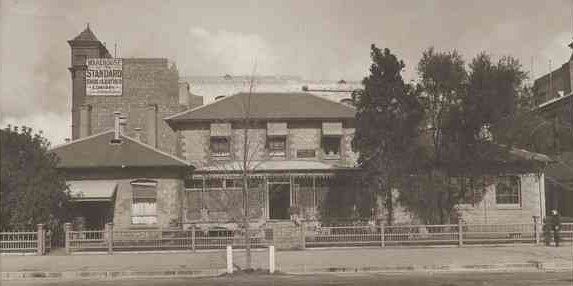
Company office c. 1909

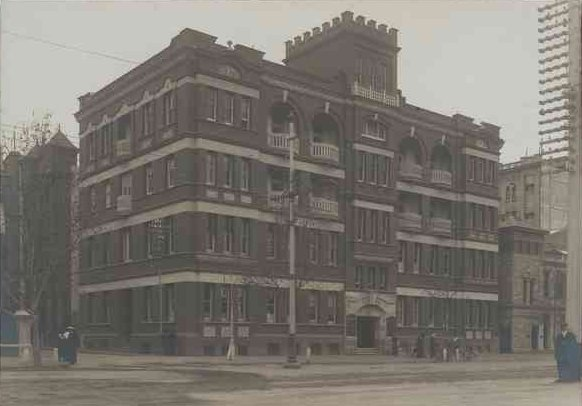
"Gawler Chambers" c. 1914

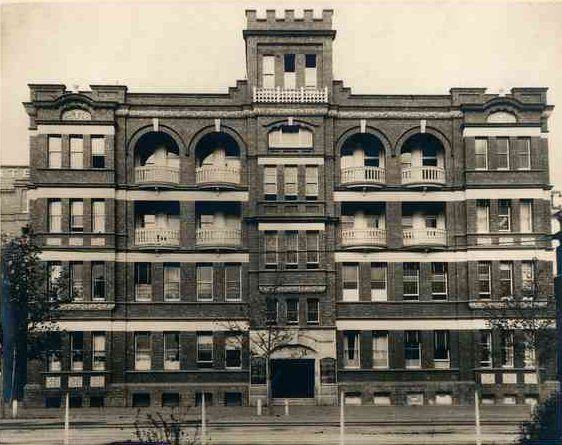
Company office c. 1914

== Lists of people ==
=== Colonial Managers ===
The colonial managers of the South Australian Company were:

Manager	From	To	Notes
Samuel Stephens	1836	1837	
David McLaren	1837	1841	
William Giles	1841	1861	
William John Brind	1861	1894	
Henry Yorke Sparks	1894	1900	
Henry Percival Moore	1901	1929	
Arthur Leopold Albert Muller	1930	1936	
(none)	1936	1949	

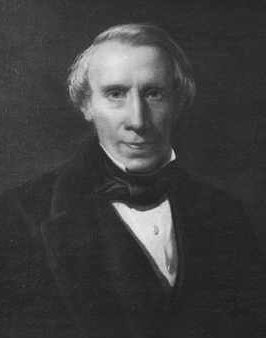
David McLaren 1837–1841

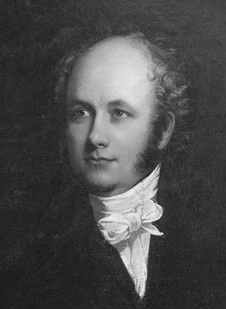
William Giles 1841–1860

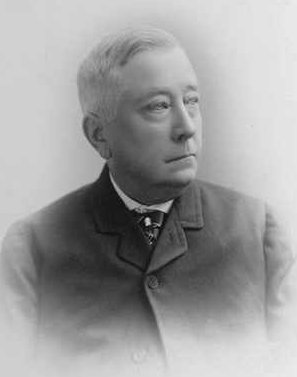
William Brind 1861–1894

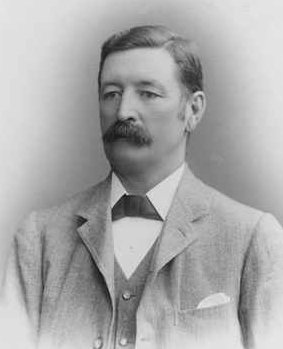
Henry Sparks 1894–1900

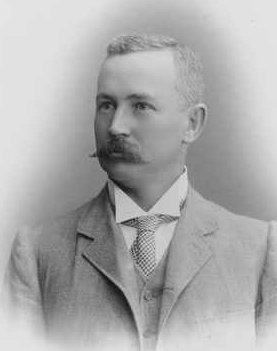
Henry Moore 1901–1929

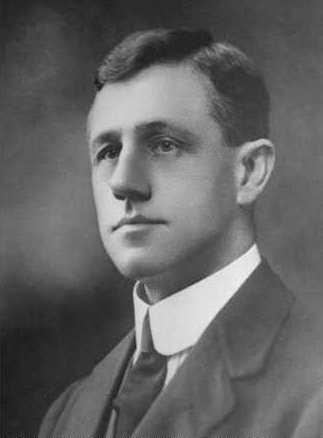
Arthur Muller 1930–1936

=== Officers of the company ===
Most of the major streets in the Adelaide city centre were named after the founding directors of the company

Chairmen

- 1836–1848 George Fife Angas (1789–1879) (Angas Street)
- 1848–1850 James Ruddell Todd (Retired AGM June 1850; died 4 December 1852)
- 1886–1888 Sir John Rose
- 1889–1897 Charles Gay Roberts
- 1898–1898 Godfrey Webb
- 1899–1923 Henry Joslin

Directors

- 1836–18?? Raikes Currie (Currie Street)
- 1836–18?? Charles Hindley (Hindley Street)
- 1836–18?? James Hyde
- 1836–18?? Henry Kingscote
- 1836–18?? John Pirie (Pirie Street)
- 1836–18?? Christopher Rawson
- 1836–18?? John Rundle (Rundle Street)
- 1836–18?? Thomas Smith
- 1836–1848 James Ruddell Todd
- 1836–1848 Henry Waymouth (Waymouth Street; died 23 January 1848)
- 1880–1911 Major General Sir Stanley De A.C. Clarke, G.C.V.O., C.M.G.
- 1889–1919 Sir John H. Kennaway, Bart. C.B., M.P.
- 1891–1922 Andrew Johnston
- 1895–1931 John Henry Grant
- 1899–1931 Sir R.H. Hermon Hodge (later Lord Wyfold)
- Joseph Fisher
- Robert Barr Smith
- Tom Elder Barr Smith

Company Secretaries

- 1878–1911 James Hutchison
- 1911–1930+ Henry Brandreth Gibbs F.C.I.S.

Attorneys in South Australia

- William Bartley
- 1850–1906 Sir Samuel Davenport, K.C.M.G.
- 1876–1923 John Warren Bakewell

Local Board of Advice, Adelaide

- 1841–1885 William Bartley
- 1841–18?? Edward Stephens
- 1856–1870 William Bakewell, M.P., Crown Solicitor
- 1876–1923 John Warren Bakewell
- 1886-1930+ Joseph Fisher
- 1894–1932 Sir John Lancelot Stirling K.C.M.G., M.L.C.

Accountants

- Edward Stephens
- Edward Robert Simpson (died 11 July 1900)

=== Others associated with the company ===
Most of the major streets in the Adelaide city centre were named after the founding directors of the company. Naming of the settlements streets was completed on 23 May 1837 and gazetted on 3 June by the Street Naming Committee (Adelaide).

Who	Association	Streets	Notes
George Fife Angas (1789–1879)	Commissioner	Angas Street	
Raikes Currie (1801–1881)	Founding director	Currie Street	
Divett, Edward	Trustee	Divett Place	
Sir James Hurtle Fisher (1790–1875)	Resident Commissioner (#1)	Hurtle Square	
Fussell, John	Trustee		Took over from Henry Waymouth after his death in January 1848.
George Gawler (1795–1869)	Governor of SA (1838–1841)	Gawler Place	Gawler (town), Gawler Ranges, etc.
William Giles (1791–1862)	Colonial Manager (1841–1860)		
Robert Gouger (1802–1846)	Colonial Secretary (#1)	Gouger Street	
Pascoe St Leger Grenfell (1798–1879)	South Australian Church Society	Grenfell Street	
Sir George Grey (1812–1898)	Governor of SA (1841–1845)		
Charles Hindley	Founding director	Hindley Street	
Sir John Hindmarsh (1785–1860)	Governor of SA (1836–1838)	Hindmarsh Square	
William Hutt	Commissioner	Hutt Street	
Henry Kingscote	Founding Director		Kingscote, Kangaroo Island
Sir George Strickland Kingston (1807–1880)	Deputy Surveyor General		Kingston SE
William Light (1786–1839)	Surveyor General	Light Square	
David McLaren (1785–1850)	Colonial Manager (1837–1841)		
Moore, Henry Percival	Colonial Manager (1901–1929)		
Sir John Morphett (1809–1892)	Land Agent	Morphett Street	
Muller, Arthur Leopold Albert	Colonial Manager (1930–1936)		
Sir John Pirie	Founding director	Pirie Street	
Rawson, Christopher	Founding director		
Frederick Robe (1801–1871)	Governor of SA (1845–1848)		Robe
John Rundle	Founding director	Rundle Street	
Smith, Thomas	Founding director		
Sparks, Henry Yorke	Colonial Manager (1894–1900)		
Edward Stephens (1811–1861)	First manager of SA Banking Co		
Samuel Stephens (1808–1840)	Colonial Manager (1836–1837)		
Todd, James Ruddell	Founding director		
Robert Torrens (1780–1864)	Commissioner		River Torrens
Daniel Bell Wakefield (1798–1858)	Drafted the bill that became the founding act	Wakefield Street	
Edward Gibbon Wakefield (1796–1862)	Early proposer of colonisation		
Henry Waymouth (1791–1848)	Founding director	Waymouth Street	
William Wolryche-Whitmore	South Australian Church Society	Whitmore Square	
Sir Henry Edward Fox Young (1803–1870)	Governor of SA (1848–1854)		

== See also ==
- British colonisation of South Australia
- Colonial Land and Emigration Commission
- History of South Australia
