= AJF =

AJF may refer to:

- Adelaide Jazz Festival, a musical event in Adelaide, Australia
- Al Jouf Airport, Saudi Arabia (IATA code "AJF")
- Art Jewelry Forum, an art and jewelry organization based in California, US
- Axel Jonsson-Fjallby, a professional ice hockey player
