= Adelaide Jazz Festival =

Australian jazz festival

The Adelaide Jazz Festival (AJF) is a city-wide musical event held in Adelaide, South Australia. It was first held in April 2023, a second event in April 2024, and a third April-May 2025.

== History ==
Founded and produced in 2023 by Kaya Blum, the festival received state government funding for the inaugural event and partnered with Adelaide Festival Centre.

The first edition of the festival hosted 12 bands in a series of venues across the city over three days from 28 to 30 April 2023. It culminated in the UNESCO International Jazz Day concert at the Adelaide Festival Centre. The program covered a wide range of jazz styles and genres, with a focus on Australian artists and local bands from Adelaide.

The participating artists in 2023 were: Bend, The 6 ft Pelicans, Soylent Green, Penny Eames Band, Lucky Seven, Women in Jazz Adelaide, Er@ser Description, Kara Manansala, Django Rowe Quartet, DJ Oisima, DJ Troy J Been, and DJ Mike Gurrieri.

A second festival took place from 26 to 30 April 2024. A third festival was hosted at various locations across Adelaide from 24 April to 2 May 2025.

== Venues ==
The venues have included:

- Arthur Art Bar
- Dunstan Playhouse
- Elder Hall
- Ern Malley bar, Stepney
- Grace Emily Hotel
- Hal's Hall, University of Adelaide
- The Jade
- The Lab, Light Square
- Queens Theatre
