= Henry Waymouth =

- Born: January 21, 1775; Exeter
- Died: 23 January 1848 (aged 73); Bryanston Square, London

Henry Waymouth (21 January 1775– 23 January 1848), also spelt Weymouth, was a Baptist activist and campaigner, and a founder of the South Australian Company.

Waymouth was born in Exeter, the son of Henry (d.1803) and Sarah Waymouth (née Bryant, c. 1750–after 1811). In 1799 he married Sarah Thorpe (d. 1848). After moving to London, he became involved in numerous organizations intended to advance the position of Dissenters. He was a member of the Committee for the Repeal of the Test and Corporation Acts, 1827–28 and he was deputy chairman (1825–32) and then chairman (1832–44) of the civil rights organization Protestant Dissenting Deputies.

In the autumn of 1824, Waymouth was active in a scheme circulated by Daniel Bogue for a Dissenting university, joining a provisional committee, but the following year he met with Henry Brougham and others to explore folding these plans into the developing plan for the non-sectarian self-styled "London University" (later renamed University College London). When the new university was founded in 1826, Waymouth was a member of its first council, and he continued to be active over a number of years. He was involved in several other educational organizations, including being a long-lasting committee member of the Society for the Diffusion of Useful Knowledge (1826) and one of the managers of the London Institution.

In 1823, Waymouth became a founding committee member of the Anti-Slavery Society. He was also one of the founding financial backers and a Director of the South Australian Company, which was formed in January 1836. Waymouth Street, Adelaide took its name from him. On his death in London on 23 January 1848, Thomas Fussell, the second largest shareholder, was elected to the vacant position.
