= Waymouth Street =

East–west street in Australia

Waymouth Street South Australia
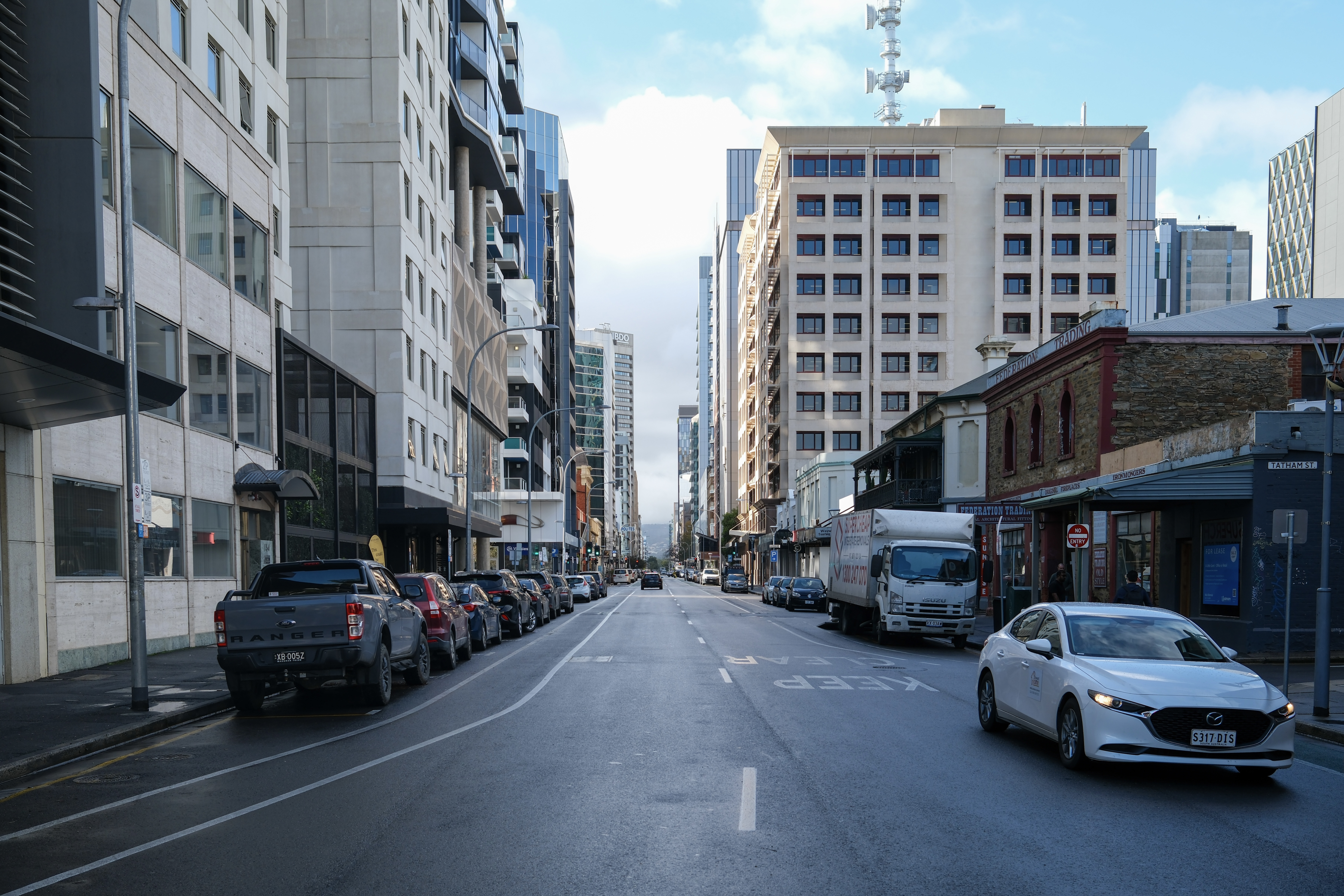
- Waymouth Street, looking east from Light Square
- Coordinates: 34.926354°S 138.587717°E (West end); 34.925768°S 138.599728°E (East end)

General information
- Type: Street
- Location: Adelaide city centre
- Length: 1.1 km (0.7 mi)
- Opened: 1837

Major junctions
- West end: West Terrace; Adelaide
- Light Square; Morphett Street
- East end: King William Street; Adelaide

Location(s)
- LGA(s): City of Adelaide

Waymouth Street, often spelt as Weymouth Street in the early days, is an east–west street running between King William Street and West Terrace in the Adelaide city centre in South Australia. The street is named after Henry Waymouth, a founding director of the South Australian Company, whose name was also sometimes spelt as Weymouth.

== Description ==
The street runs between King William Street and West Terrace, on the western side of the city centre. It is intersected by Light Square.

=== Eastern section ===
The section of Waymouth Street from King William Street to Light Square is lined by commercial office buildings with many restaurants and cafes at ground level. It is the location of the state headquarters of organisations including ANZ, the Department for Environment and Water, Beyond Bank Australia, EY and News Corp Australia. At the intersection with King William Street, there is a pedestrian scramble crossing and a Glenelg tram line stop named after Pirie Street, which continues to the east.

=== Central section ===
Waymouth Street forms the southern boundary of Light Square, an open grassy park in the centre of the north-west quadrant of the city centre. This section of Waymouth Street is one-way traffic to the west; east-bound traffic must detour around the square. Traffic signals control the intersection with Morphett Street where it divides to go around the square. A few bars, nightclubs and restaurants are located on the southern side of Waymouth Street and around Light Square.

=== Western section ===
The section from Light Square to West Terrace has for most of its history had lower-scale retail and residential buildings, along with hotels and hostels. Formerly a low-rise and quiet part of the city, the western end of Waymouth Street is now the site of high-rise residential buildings. There is a 17-storey student accommodation tower opposite the Grace Emily Hotel, which was described as "ugly" and "unsympathetic" by two city councillors during its construction in 2017. As of June 2024 there are plans to redevelop the site on the corner of Waymouth and Gray Streets (262-268), creating a 52-metre (171 ft) high apartment building. There is an existing 17-storey student accommodation block on Gray Street.

Across from the intersection with West Terrace is a service road for Adelaide High School and an entrance point to shared pedestrian and bicycle tracks in the western parklands.

== History ==
The street was named after Henry Waymouth, a founding director of the South Australian Company, by the Street Naming Committee in 1837. Until 1863 it was almost invariably spelled "Weymouth"; the eponymous director was then given either spelling interchangeably.

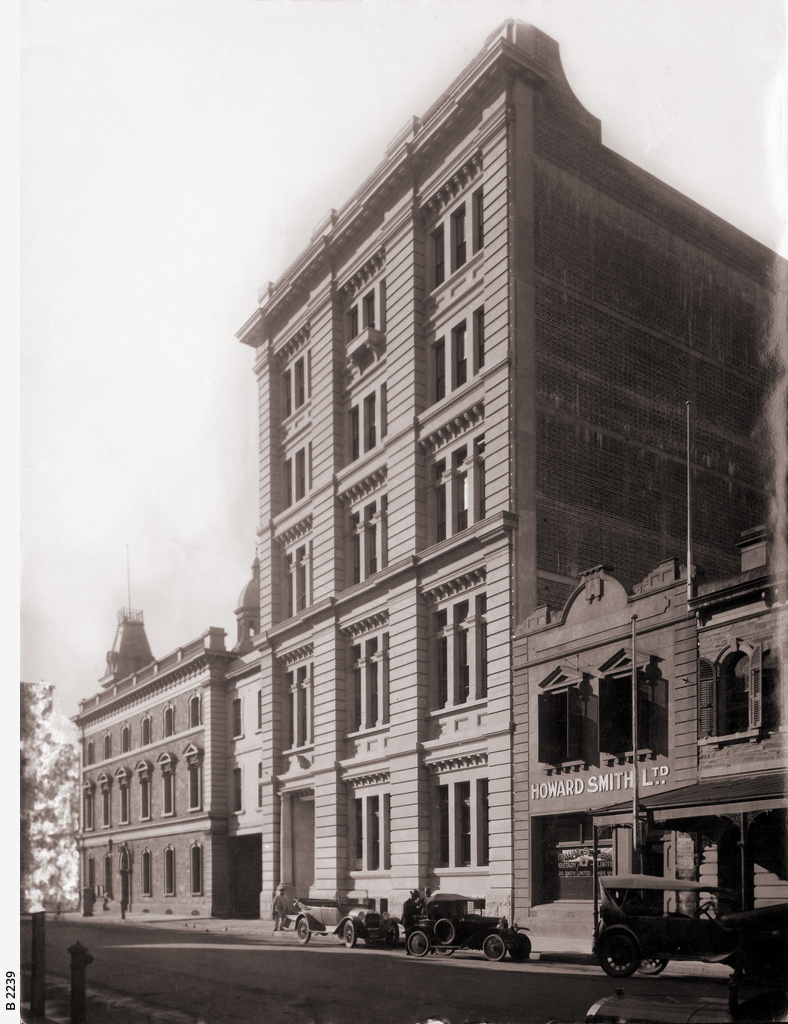
The former Advertiser building, Waymouth St, 1924

The original three-storey Advertiser building was on the southern corner with King William Street, with a new five-storey building constructed alongside it in Waymouth Street (37 yd (34 m) west of King William and extending 22 yd (20 m) along Waymouth, completed in early 1924. Both buildings were replaced in 1959 by a 12-storey building, and then again in 2005 by a 9-storey glass building.

=== Incidents ===
On 2 March 1994, a bomb exploded in the National Crime Authority offices in a building on Waymouth Street, after being sent to NCA Senior Investigator Detective Sergeant Geoffrey Bowen, killing him and severely injuring lawyer Peter Wallis. The initial suspect, Domenic Perre, who was released for lack of evidence shortly after being arrested, was re-arrested in 2018. Perre was standing on top of a nearby carpark and was later arrested at his house. He entered a plea (of not guilty) for the first time in the Adelaide Magistrates Court on 17 February 2020 but his lawyer conceded that there is a case to answer and he was committed to stand trial in the Supreme Court of South Australia.

== The Grace Emily ==
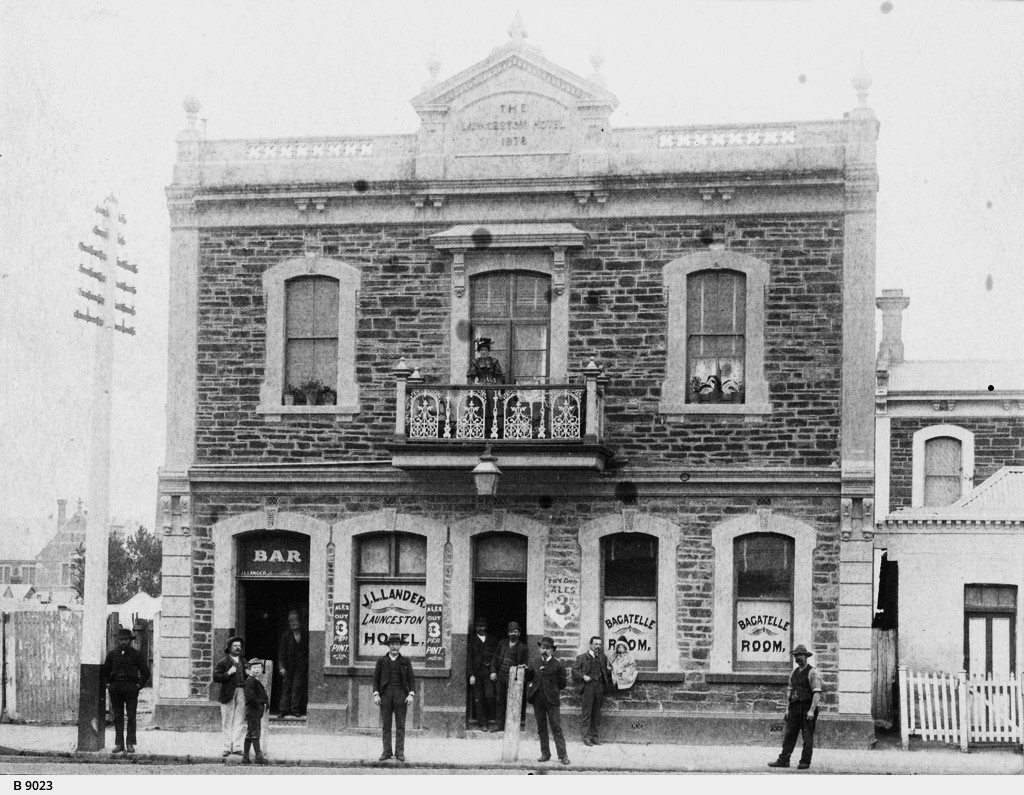
The Launceston Hotel, Adelaide c.1894

The Grace Emily Hotel, at number 232, is well known for its live music, and for some time and as of 2024 it has a regular Monday night gig called "Billy Bob's BBQ Jam", an open mic night and jam session which is hosted by Billy Bob and the BBQ Boys. Each Wednesday is a jazz night, and there is live music on most nights, including touring acts and local musicians on the weekend. Marlon Williams, Julia Jacklin, Justin Townes Earle, the Mountain Goats, Tim Rogers (many times), and Ringo Starr's backing band have played at the venue. The hotel also plays host to musicians as part of festivals such as the annual "Guitars in Bars".

The first establishment on the site, the Launceston Hotel, opened in the early days of the colony of South Australia, in 1839, serving the working-class poor who lived in the area. It functioned as a front parlour, dance hall and coroner's court. In 1894, it was run by publican John L. Lander, and had a bagatelle room. By 1941, the Victorian-style architecture with its ornate windows, decorative ironwork on a small balcony, and bluestone facade had been replaced by a rendered frontage and balcony stretching the length of the building, as it stands today. Its name had changed slightly, to Hotel Launceston, and the publican was James T. Bryan. The hotel has also been known as the Whaler's Return (for a few years in the late 1800s) and Rupara Hotel.

In 1998, Hotel Launceston was put on the market. A bikie gang's bid was refused by authorities, and South Adelaide Football Club teammates Greg Kleynjans and Craig Dewhirst stepped in and bought the pub. They renamed the pub the Grace Emily Hotel after their "footy mum", a woman called Grace Emily who lived locally and would pop in every evening for a cup of tea. They renamed the pub before her death in 2004. Symon Jarowyj took over the business in 2010, with business partner George Swallow, after Kleynhans moved to Melbourne.

The Grace Emily won Best Music Venue in the South Australian Music Awards in 2016 and 2017. In 2017, the venue was inducted into the SA Music Hall of Fame, for its commitment to live music. It also won SA Live Music Venue of the Year in the National Live Music Awards of 2017.

The Grace Emily played host to Adelaide Jazz Festival gigs in April 2023 and April 2024.

In September 2023, the Grace Emily was one of seven independent music venues in South Australia to form the Independent Live Venues Alliance (ILVA), with funding from the state government through the Music Development Office. The other venues are: Jive and the Broadcast Bar in the city centre; inner-metro venues The Governor Hindmarsh and Wheatsheaf Hotel; along with the Semaphore Workers Club in Semaphore and the Murray Delta Juke Joint on the Fleurieu Peninsula. The group's first event was the four-day "Everyday Event", with 14 gigs hosted across the venues between 19 and October 2023.

In August 2026 it was announced that the pub would be changing hands from 1 September, its owner of around 16 years Symon Jarowyj handing over to Kyle Landman (a member of punk band Young Offenders), Joe Wilkinson, and Shane Ettridge.

== Historic buildings ==
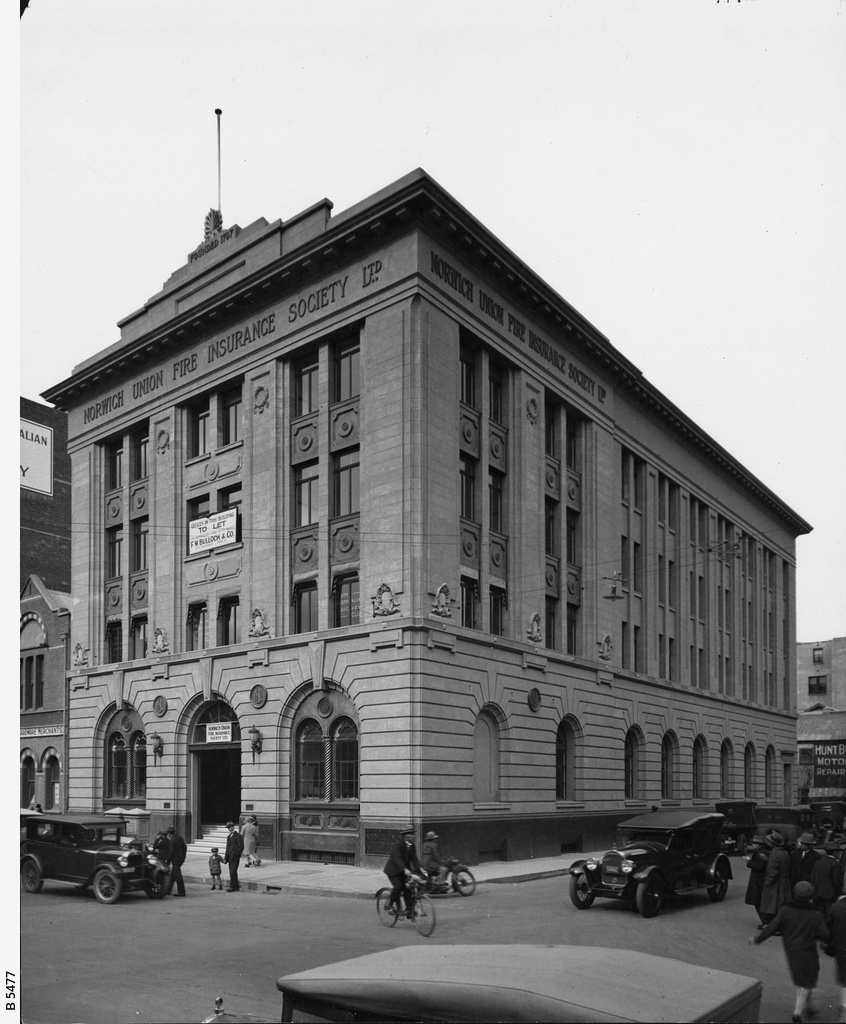
Woodards House, Waymouth Street, Adelaide

There are several locally heritage-listed buildings on Waymouth Street, and as of 2024 two on the South Australian Heritage Register:

- Woodards House, originally an office building designed by prominent architect F. Kenneth Milne (then in practice as F. Kenneth Milne, Evans & Russell) for Norwich Union Fire Insurance Society, which included ground floor offices for the Commercial Bank of Australia. The building contractor was prominent local builder Frederick Fricker, who died suddenly while on holiday, in Port Said, before the building was completed. The building was officially opened on 5 June 1929, after a dinner the previous night attended by many local dignitaries. The building was state heritage-listed on 23 August 2013, and described as "an outstanding example of a building constructed in the Inter-War Commercial Palazzo style". An additional floor was added in 1953.
- The Cumberland Arms Hotel, at no. 205, was designed by Henry Colls Richardson for Sir Edwin Thomas Smith and built in 1883. It was heritage-listed in 1986. The business was originally licensed as the Crown and Anchor Hotel, and was situated in Elizabeth Street. The hotel accommodates 731 patrons and has several function areas and a large beer garden. The interiors were redecorated not long before the property went on the market in March 2025, not long after an 18-storey residential development was approved for a site in Elizabeth Street behind the hotel, on the other side of a two-storey dwelling.
