= Light Square =

Square in Adelaide, South Australia

- Wauwi
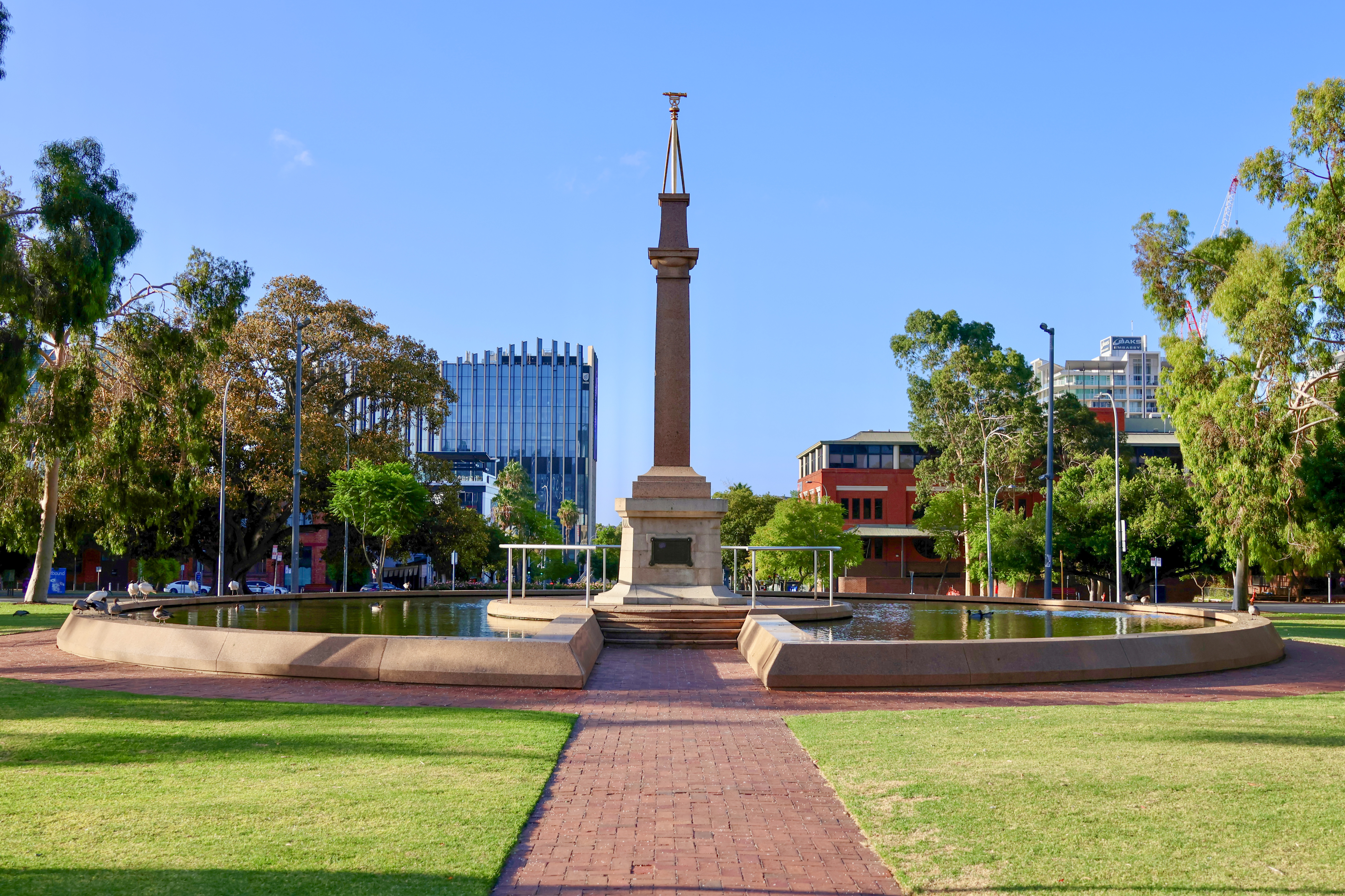
- The William Light monument in 2026

- Location within City of Adelaide
- Namesake: William Light
- Maintained by: City of Adelaide
- Location: Adelaide, South Australia, Australia
- Postal code: 5000
- Coordinates: 34.9251°S 138.5936°E
- North: Morphett Street
- East: Currie Street; Waymouth Street
- South: Morphett Street
- West: Currie Street; Waymouth Street

Construction
- Completed: c. 1837

Other
- Designer: William Light

Light Square, also known by its Kaurna name Wauwi, is one of the public squares in central Adelaide, South Australia. Located in the north-western quarter of the city, it is bounded by Waymouth Street to the south, while Currie Street crosses its northern section and Morphett Street runs through the square from north to south. The square was included in William Light's 1837 plan for Adelaide and was named after him on 23 May 1837 by the Street Naming Committee. In 2003, the Adelaide City Council assigned the square the Kaurna dual name Wauwe, later standardised as Wauwi, as part of a broader recognition of Kaurna heritage and language.

Light Square includes a number of statues and public artwork pieces. After Light's death in 1839, he was interred in Light Square after being accorded South Australia's first state funeral ceremony. In 1844, a monument commissioned by architect George Strickland Kingston was set up over his tomb, and the existing monument, that was unveiled on 21 June 1905, replaced it. The monument consists of a bronze tripod with a theodolite placed above a granite column, while the grave is the only marked place of interment apart from a graveyard within the city of Adelaide. Some of the other sculptures in Light Square include the statue of Catherine Helen Spence, Knot by Bert Flugelman, The Eternal Question by Richard Tipping, and the Pride Walk that was put up in 2016 in commemoration of the South Australian LGBTQI community.

== Name ==
William Light was a soldier and surveyor born in Kuala Kedah, Kedah Sultanate, and educated in England. He joined the Royal Navy and British Army, taking up several staff positions during the Peninsular War before retiring from the service in 1821. Thereafter, he travelled in Europe, indulged himself in some artistic work and took part in a few liberal military endeavours in Spain before moving to the Mediterranean and Egypt where he knew Muhammad Ali personally. After being made the Surveyor General of South Australia in 1836, he chose the location for Adelaide and carried out its planning and survey in 1836–37, along with its street layout and surrounding parklands. Faced with opposition over surveying techniques and shortage of resources, he resigned in 1838 and died in Adelaide in 1839 from tuberculosis. In recognition of the survey conducted by Light himself, this particular square was named by the Street Naming Committee on the 23 May 1837, and gazetted on the 3 June in that same year.

In 1997, a proposal was made to the Adelaide City Corporation to apply the Kaurna name Ityamaiitpinna (King Rodney) to Light Square as part of broader recognition of Kaurna place names within the Adelaide Park Lands. In 2000, the city corporation explored other possibilities of names, such as Wauwe, although Ityamaiitpinna was not chosen for Light Square but instead used for another park in the Park 15. Wauwe, which translates to "female (western grey) kangaroo," was named for the spouse of Kadlitpinna, often known as "Captain Jack," one of the three Kaurna Burkas, or elders, during the period of colonisation. The spelling was changed to Wauwi in February 2013.

== Geography ==
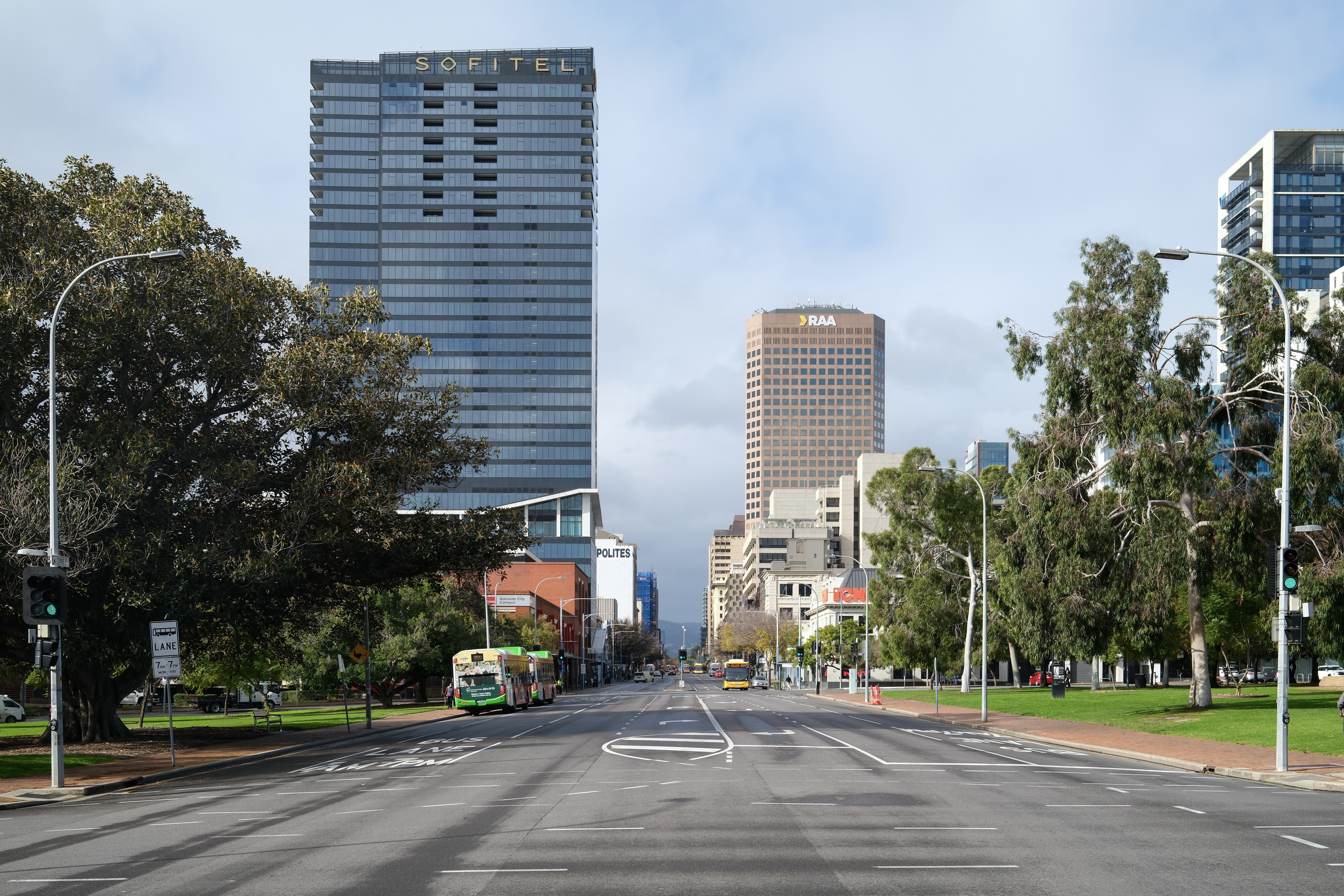
Currie Street bisecting Light Square, looking eastwards, June 2026

Light Square is located on Morphett Street's north–south route and is bordered by Currie Street to the north and Waymouth Street to the south, forming part of its immediate street grid within central Adelaide.

Among the buildings around Light Square are some that are educational, commercial and even heritage listed buildings. There is the Adelaide College of the Arts (AC Arts) which was established on Light Square in 2001 and is a purpose-built institution by TAFE SA. Amongst these heritage buildings are the former Goldsbrough Mort warehouse, the Colonel Light Hotel, the former Cobbs Restaurant Building, and the former City Mission Hall. Amongst the structures in the northwest corner of the square is the former Goldsbrough Mort & Co. building that is distinguished by its utilitarian brick construction with repeated arched designs. There is the Colonel Light Hotel which was reconstructed in 1898 to fulfill lease conditions which stipulated that a new hotel worth no less than £1,500 be erected; before taking on its current name the hotel has been referred to by other names such as the Billy Barlow and the Shamrock Hotel. The building that used to be known as Cobbs Restaurant located on 63 Light Square, was built in 1883 as part of Adelaide's rapid growth in the latter part of the 19th century. The City Mission Hall was opened in 1878 as a charitable center offering food and literacy services to needy people.

== History ==
Light Square is one of the six squares included in Light's 1837 plan of Adelaide, developed during his tenure as Surveyor General of South Australia. According to his plan, the square was meant to be part of the surrounding parklands that would serve as continuous open space surrounding the city. On the survey map prepared by him, the square was shown as a rectangular or village square inside the grid. In the early colonial period, the square remained largely undeveloped until 1839, when Light died in Adelaide. At his request, he was buried in a vault within the square. His funeral service was held at Trinity Church on 10 October 1839 and included military honours, with minute guns fired and flags at Government House flown at half-mast. The burial and funeral were attended by a large public gathering. By the later 19th century, the square became more formally defined within the urban landscape. Around 1880, it was enclosed by an iron palisade fence with six gates providing access from surrounding streets and pathways.

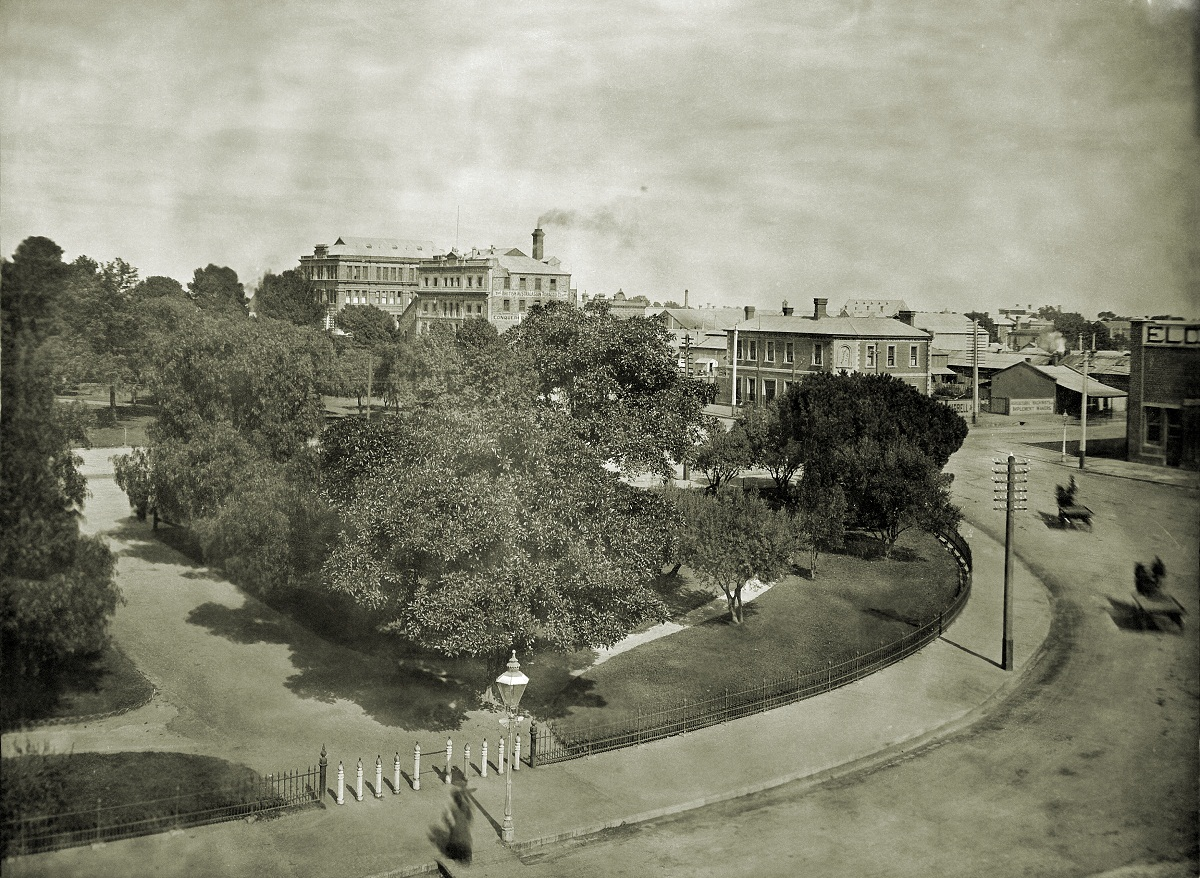
Light Square in 1911, featuring the curved road encircling the formal gardens, and the Colonel Light Hotel (centre right)

Between the years 1900–1902, work on Light Square by City Gardener August Pelzer included the enlargement of couch grass lawns, planting of shrubs near the toilet facilities, and the placement of hoops in 1901 to prevent footpaths from developing. During 1900, Pelzer recommended fencing off Adelaide squares, including Light Square, to prevent dogs from damaging them. The process of fencing continued throughout the squares and was completed towards the end of 1901, with the process of painting being completed during 1902. From 1908 to 1909, there was a suggestion for the move of playgrounds from the squares into nearby parks, with changes being made due to tramway construction. The tramways were built in 1908, where one track ran east and west down Currie Street, and in 1910 the street itself was extended down through the northern boundary of Light Square.

Further changes were made in the 1920s with regard to paths, kerbs, and fencing when the cast iron palisade fencing was removed, as well as when trees which were not considered suitable or alive were also taken away. Although vegetation clearance led to the opening up of the square, certain types of trees including pepper trees, olive trees, Moreton Bay figs, southern nettle trees, and river sheoaks were kept to retain aspects of the Gardenesque planting layout. In 1928, a remodelling scheme was proposed by the city gardener and accepted by the Adelaide City Corporation. This entailed widening of Waymouth Street and more changes to fences, paths, structures, and trees.

During the mid-1980s, landscape improvements were done in Light Square, which included the cutting down of mature trees, planting of new avenue plantings, and changes made to the internal paths. These improvements occurred after recommendations from the Adelaide City Heritage Study of 1981 suggested that Light Square should be considered for inclusion in the South Australian Heritage Register together with Victoria Square and Wellington Square, even though the latter two were the only ones to be placed on the register. Other further additions included a bronze plaque during an unveiling ceremony held on 19 October 1986.

In 2025, the city of Adelaide finalized plans to further develop the square as a green space, removing road surface to make space for more vegetation.

== Statues and monuments ==
=== Colonel William Light ===
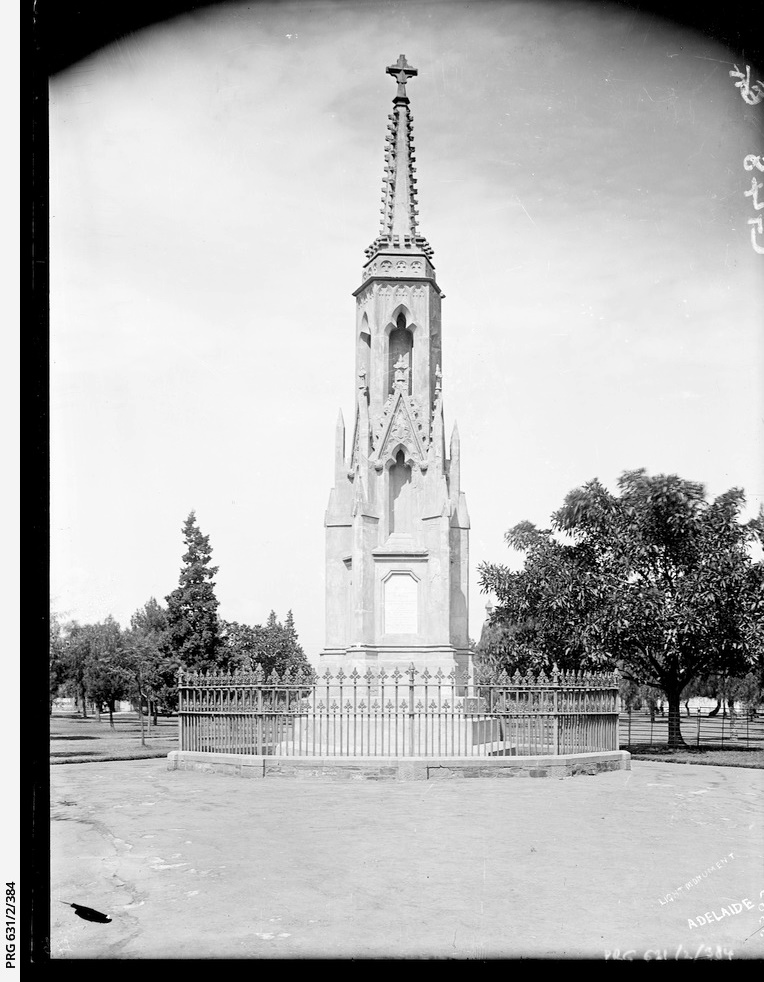
The first monument to Light, c. 1894

Following the death of Light in 1839, arrangements were made to bury him at Light Square, as per his own desire to be buried at the square named after him, and he was given a state funeral in what became the first ever state funeral conducted in South Australia. In 1843, the Adelaide City Corporation ordered the creation of a memorial over his tomb, which was designed by George Strickland Kingston, and which included a Gothic sandstone cross or column, built at a cost estimated to be between £460. The monument was completed in 1844. In 1876, the Adelaide City Council ordered the installation of a white marble plaque on the tomb to include an inscription about the contributions made by the pioneers towards the creation of the memorial. The grave and monument are the only marked burial site outside a cemetery within the city of Adelaide.

However, by 1892, the original monument had been in a considerable state of disrepair, motivating Mayor Frederick Bullock to form a committee dedicated to setting up a new memorial. This plan was abandoned when the government of South Australia failed to provide financial aid for it. Despite the subscriptions amounting to about £348, due to the economic recession during which banks were closing down and people were becoming unemployed, the competition that had been held as part of it failed. Another committee emerged in 1904, suggesting that apart from building the new monument, a statue would also be erected in Victoria Square, where it now stands on Montefiore Hill.

The commissioning of a new memorial then followed, with a design by H. L. Jackman being chosen that consisted of a bronze tripod and theodolite placed upon a polished granite column made out of Murray Bridge red granite topped with Monarto grey granite. J. J. Leahy was the builder, while A. W. Dobbie & Co., were responsible for casting the bronze elements. F. Burmeister was the engraver of the bronze elements, while F. H. Herring did the granite work. The original marble tablet that had been erected in 1876 was relocated in 1905, restored, placed on slate, and put into the custody of the Public Library Board at the State Library.

The unveiling of the new monument took place on 21 June 1905. The monument was dedicated by Mayor Theodore Bruce after a speech made by Deputy-Governor Samuel Way. The unveiling ceremony was attended by Premier Richard Layton Butler, along with two of his ministers, several members of Adelaide's City Council, and members of the Colonel Light Monument Committee. One hundred guests were also invited, consisting of those who had settled in South Australia before the year 1845, some of whom had witnessed the funeral of Light 66 years earlier.

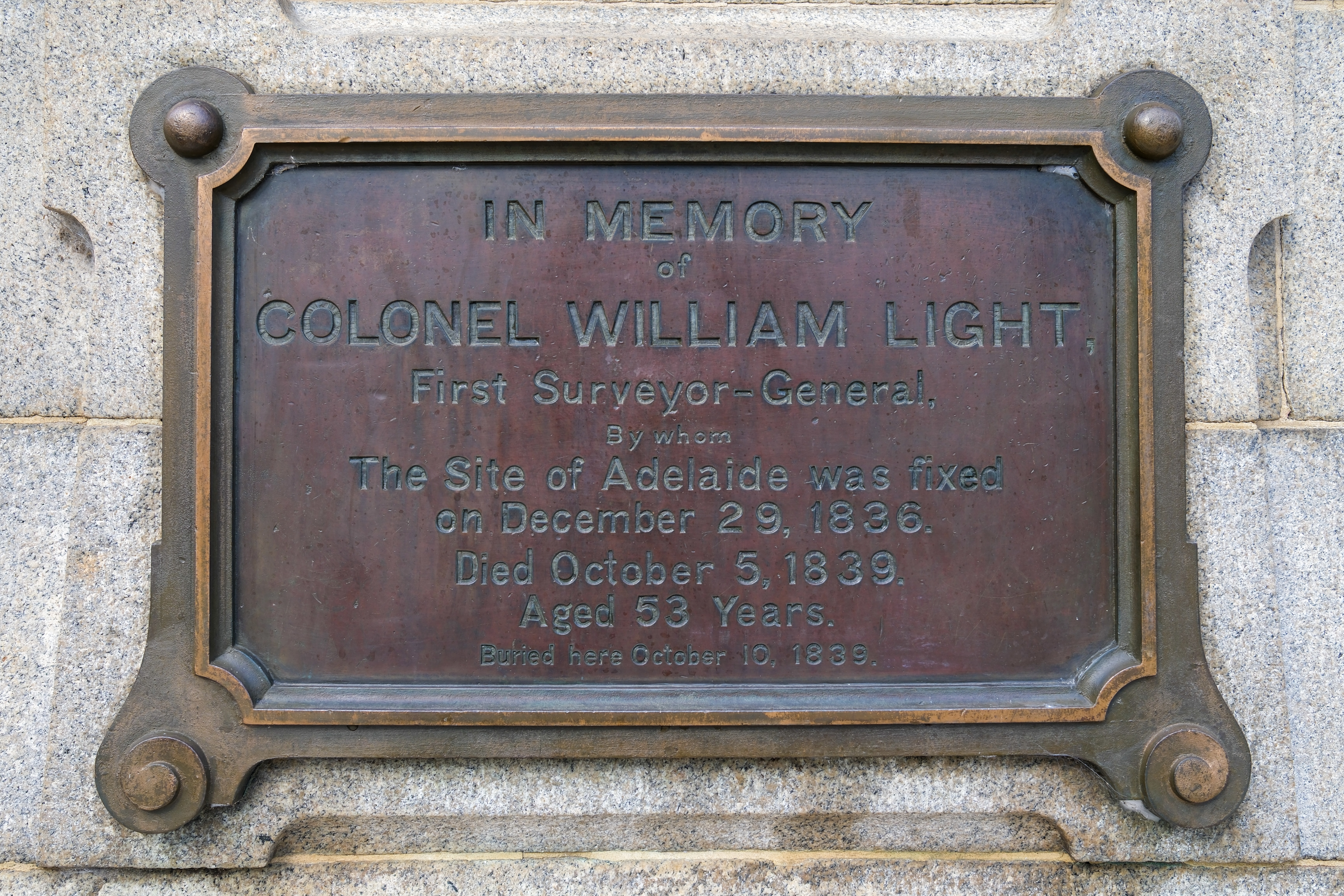

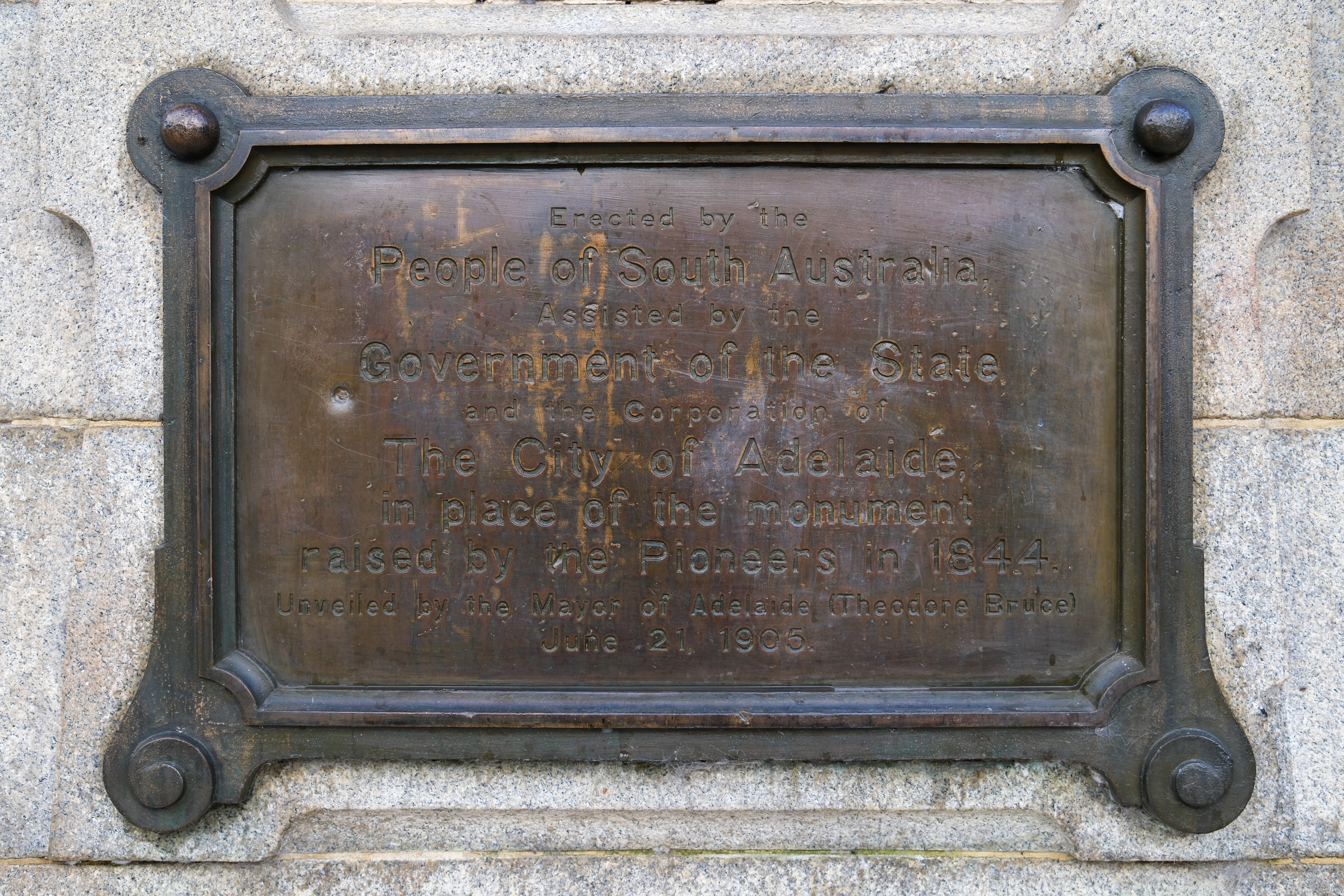

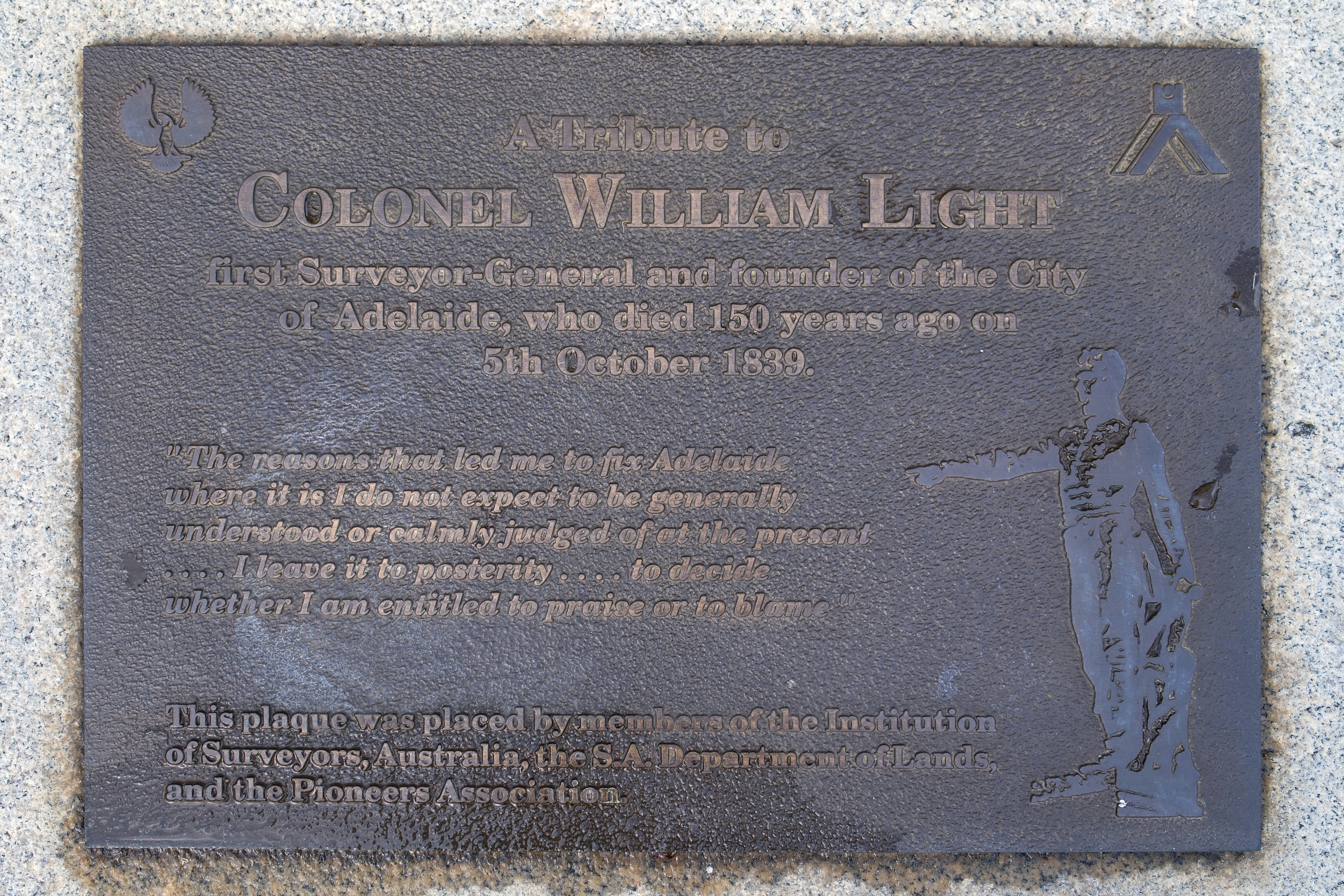

=== Catherine Helen Spence ===
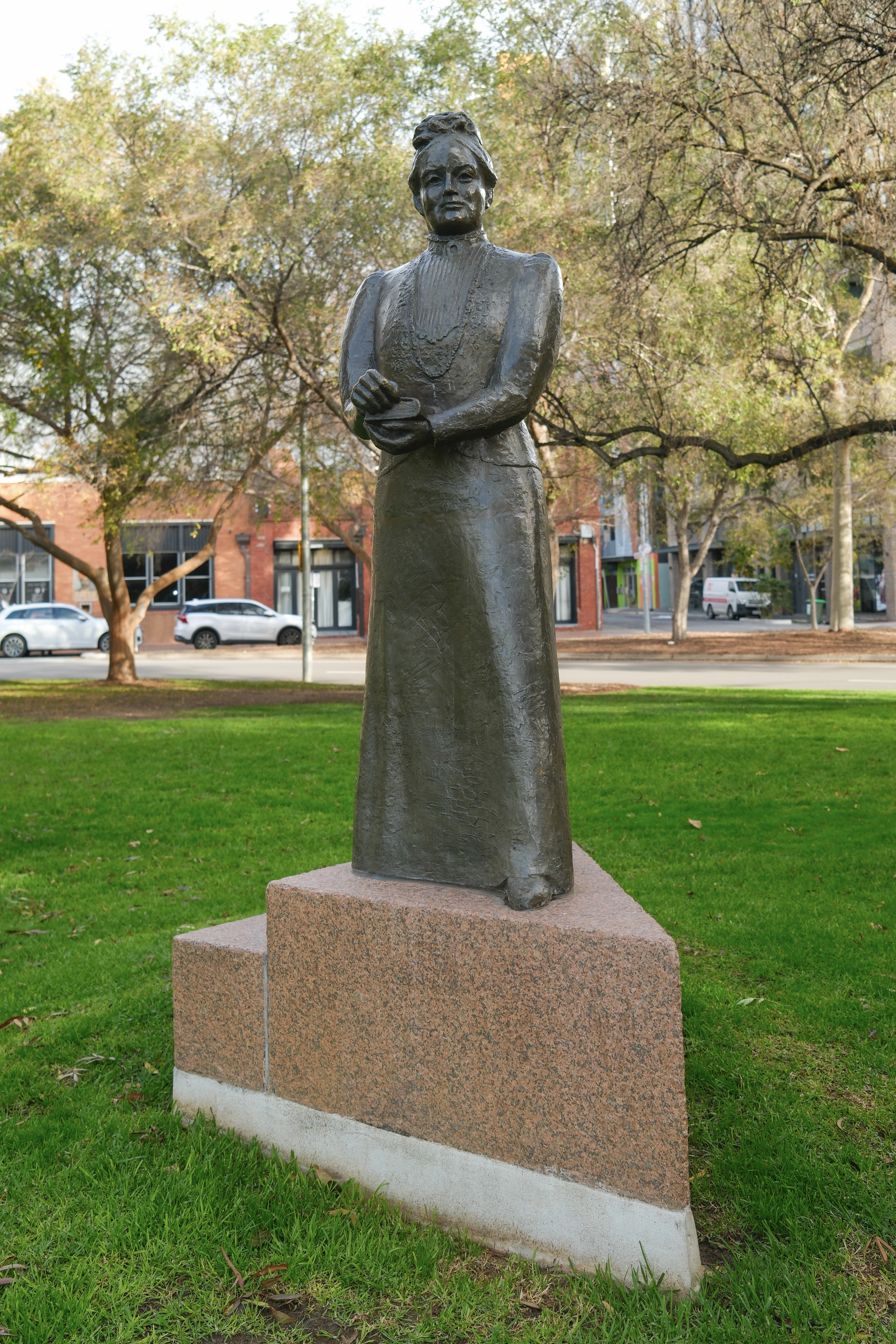
The statue of Spence, 2026

The life-sized bronze sculpture of Catherine Helen Spence was unveiled on 10 March 1986 by Queen Elizabeth II to commemorate the 150th anniversary of the European settlement in South Australia. The sculpture was made possible by both government funding and public donations. The statue was commissioned by the Women's Executive Committee of the Jubilee 150 Board as a means to recognise Spence and make up for the lack of monuments to women and sculptures created by women in Adelaide. Seven sculptors have been considered for their proposals and the idea of Ieva Pocius has been selected.

Spence is depicted standing in a Victorian dress carrying an open book, and is placed on top of a three-tiered triangular pedestal made out of granite that bears her name and identifies her as a social and political reformer, author, and minister. The sculpture can be found in the southwest corner of Light Square.

=== Knot ===
Knot is a public art piece by the sculptor Bert Flugelman which, like the Mall's Balls and Tetrahedra, is located in Adelaide. As with most of his art pieces, Knot is big in size and geometric shapes made of stainless steel surfaces meant to connect with the surroundings. This sculpture consists of two strands of stainless steel tubing joined with a polished surface that acts as a mirror reflecting both the surroundings and the people around the artwork. This artwork was created with the assistance of the Work in Public Places Scheme implemented by the Adelaide City Council. It was first placed in the gallery of the Art Gallery of South Australia between 1975 and 1995, and in 2003, the artwork was moved to the northern part of the square.

=== Pride Walk ===
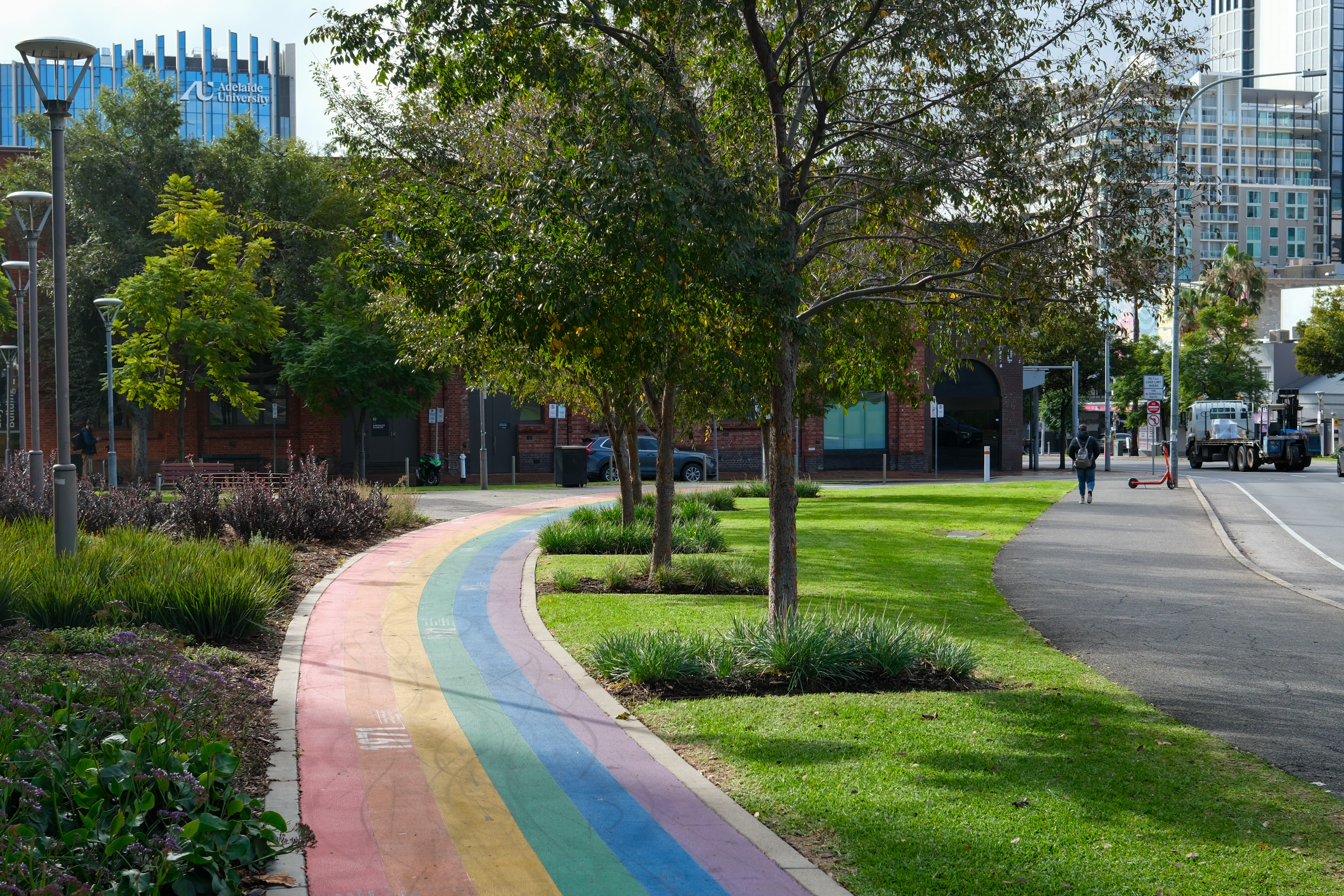
The Pride Walk in June 2026

The Pride Walk was established by the City of Adelaide in October 2016 to honour the history and accomplishments of the LGBTQI community as well as its struggles. This installation has been developed in partnership with historian Ian Purcell and it contains information regarding legal changes and policies that have been implemented in South Australia in chronological order, alongside community events. It is worth noting that South Australia is the first state in Australia where homosexuality was decriminalised in 1975.

=== The Eternal Question ===
The Eternal Question is a sculpture made out of granite by Richard Tipping in the years 1981 to 1982. The sculpture is located in the western area of the square and comprises six blocks of black granite taken from Black Hill. They are mounted in a circle formation together with a central stone laid horizontally. The blocks contain the inscriptions IS, IT, and IF, while the central stone carries a spiral symbol of a question mark with its dot signifying the sun. According to Tipping, the words stand for matter, being, and mind and explore human existence as a philosophical problem. The Eternal Question sculpture was first created to be exhibited at the Adelaide Festival of Arts in 1982 on the banks of the River Torrens. It was subsequently designed for the use in a breakwater at Robe but survived until 1983 when Ron Radford chose it for an exhibition of contemporary sculptures.

== Cultural connections ==
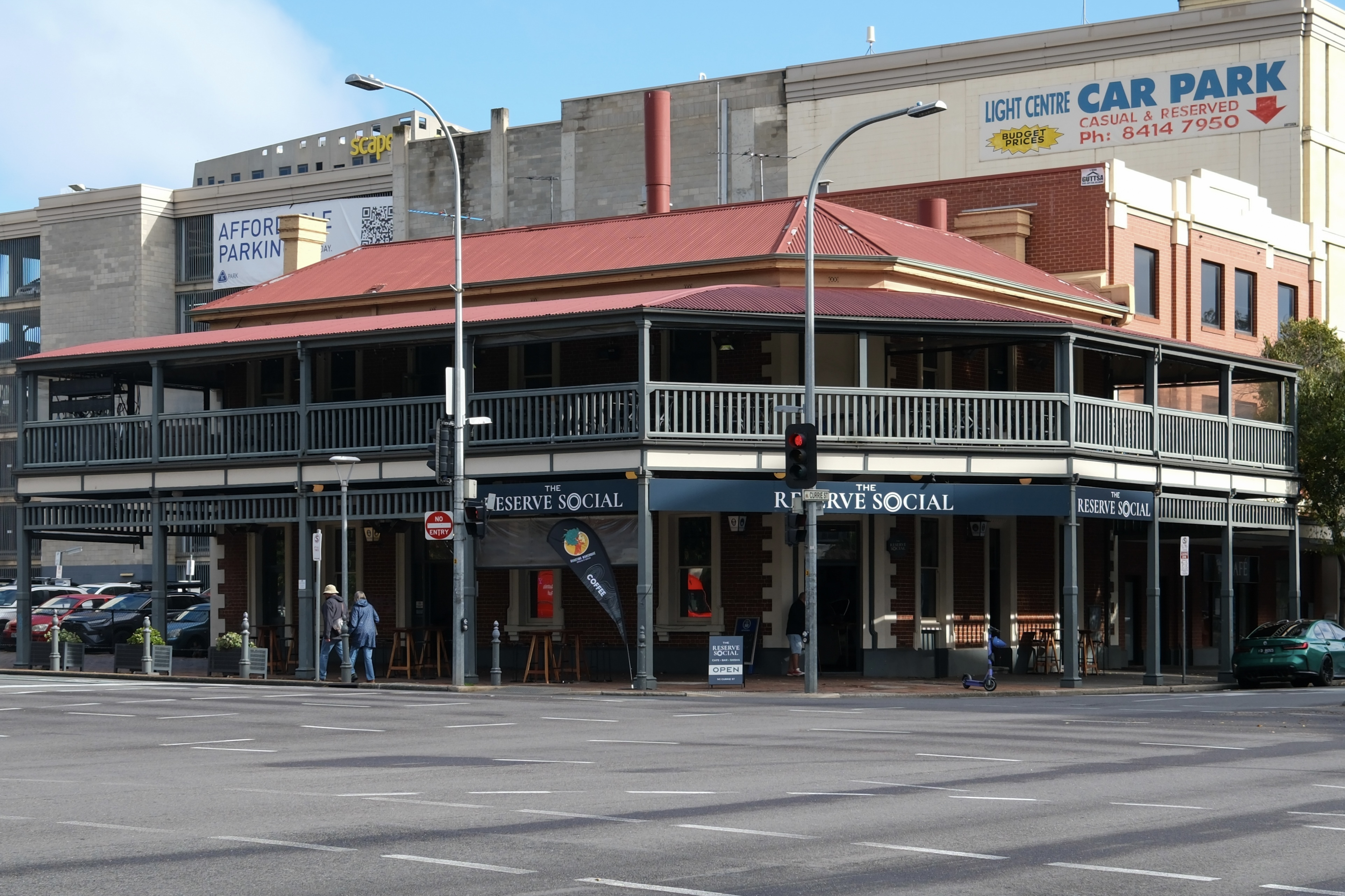
Colonel Light Hotel, photographed as a pub in June 2026

During the 19th century, the western part of Adelaide was mainly used for residential purposes where small homes would be constructed for immigrants coming to the area. With the continued population increase, there came a need to divide land parcels further to accommodate more people who included those belonging to the working class, jobless citizens, temporary migrants, prostitutes, and other socially unacceptable individuals. Towards the latter years of the 19th century, industrial buildings like factories, warehouses, and workshops would be constructed amidst the residential buildings, and the population increase from 1870 to 1890 led to problems such as overcrowding, lack of adequate sanitation, water supply, and footpaths. The combination of all these problems and the violence that took place around the Colonel Light Hotel made the West End have a bad reputation among the other areas in Adelaide.

For the Aboriginal population in Adelaide during the end of the 19th century and the beginning of the 20th century] Light Square functioned as a meeting place. For those Aboriginal people who either remained in or returned to Adelaide, such as the Kaurna, Narungga, and Ngarrindjeri people, who left mission settlements like Point Pearce and Point McLeay or moved into the city in search of employment, education, and housing. They frequently travelled back and forth between the West Park Lands and Light Square, with Light Square acting as a meeting place from roughly 1900 until the 1960s.

== Events ==
Light Square has been used as a venue for public events including Adelaide Fringe performances, music events, and festivals. The Adelaide College of the Arts has operated as a venue associated with the Adelaide Festival. The arts venue Immersive Light and Art (ILA), at 63 Light Square, has hosted events as part of the Adelaide Fringe, Adelaide Festival and Illuminate Adelaide, while also presenting its own arts experiences and events, including The Immersive Table. From May 2019, the APY Art Centre Collective occupied the former Night Train complex at 9 Light Square as a gallery and studio space representing artist centres from the APY Lands and Northern Territory. It is now owned by Adelaide University and is the Innovation and Collaboration Centre. Light installations and projections have also been staged in the square during Illuminate Adelaide events.

== Gallery ==
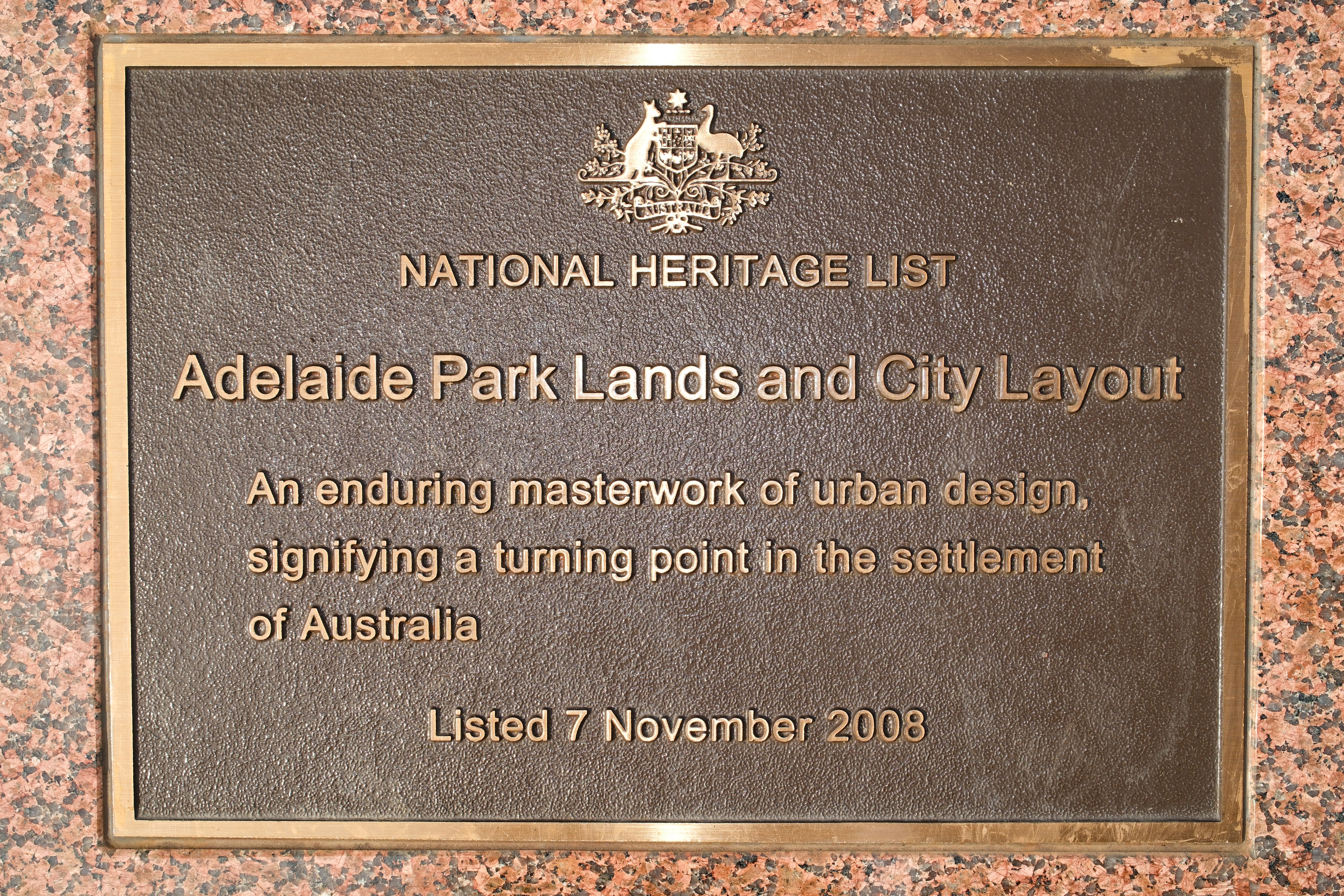
Plaque commemorating the City of Adelaide Layout's inclusion in the National Heritage List in 2008

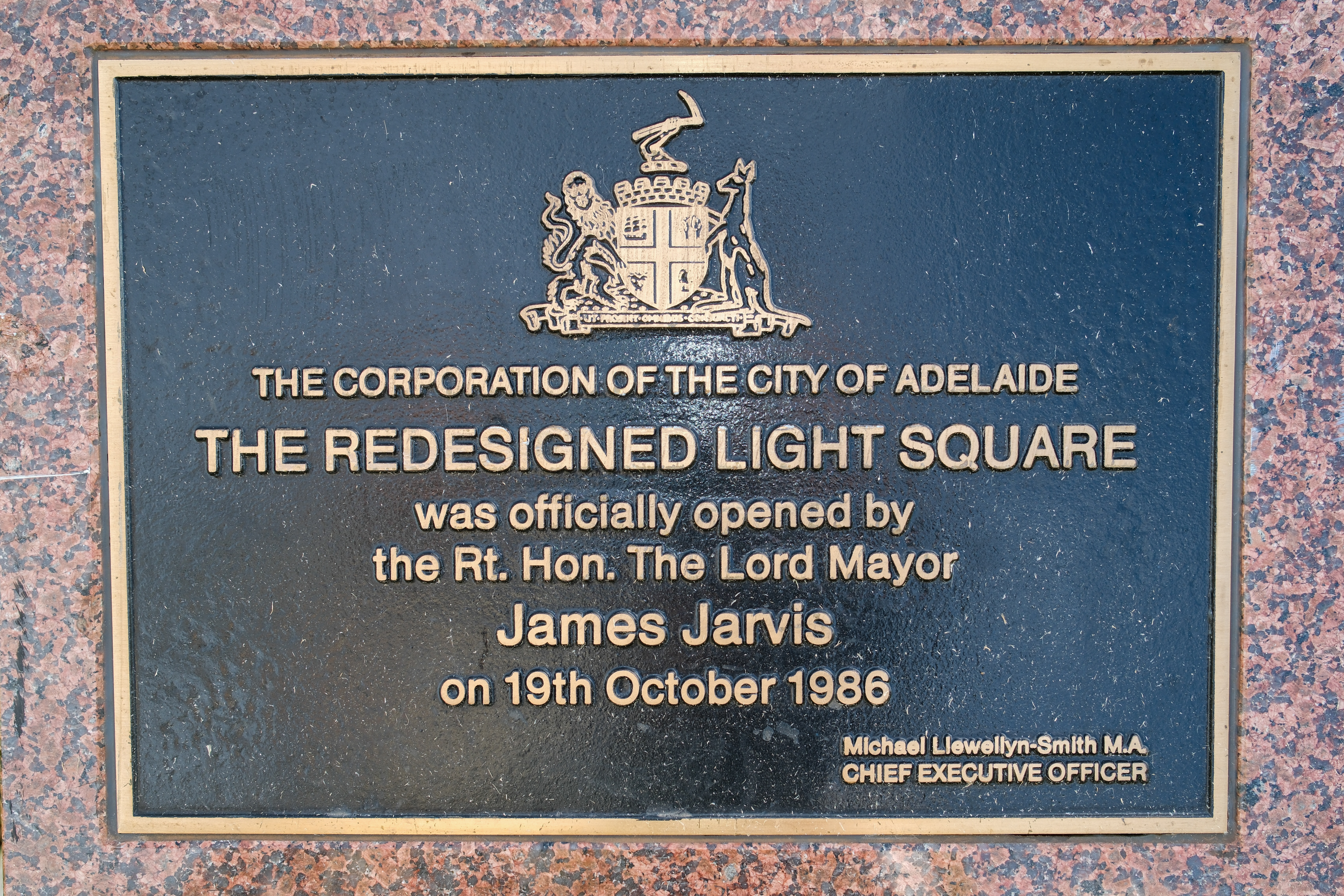
Plaque commemorating the redesign of Light Square, unveiled by Mayor James Jarvis in 1986

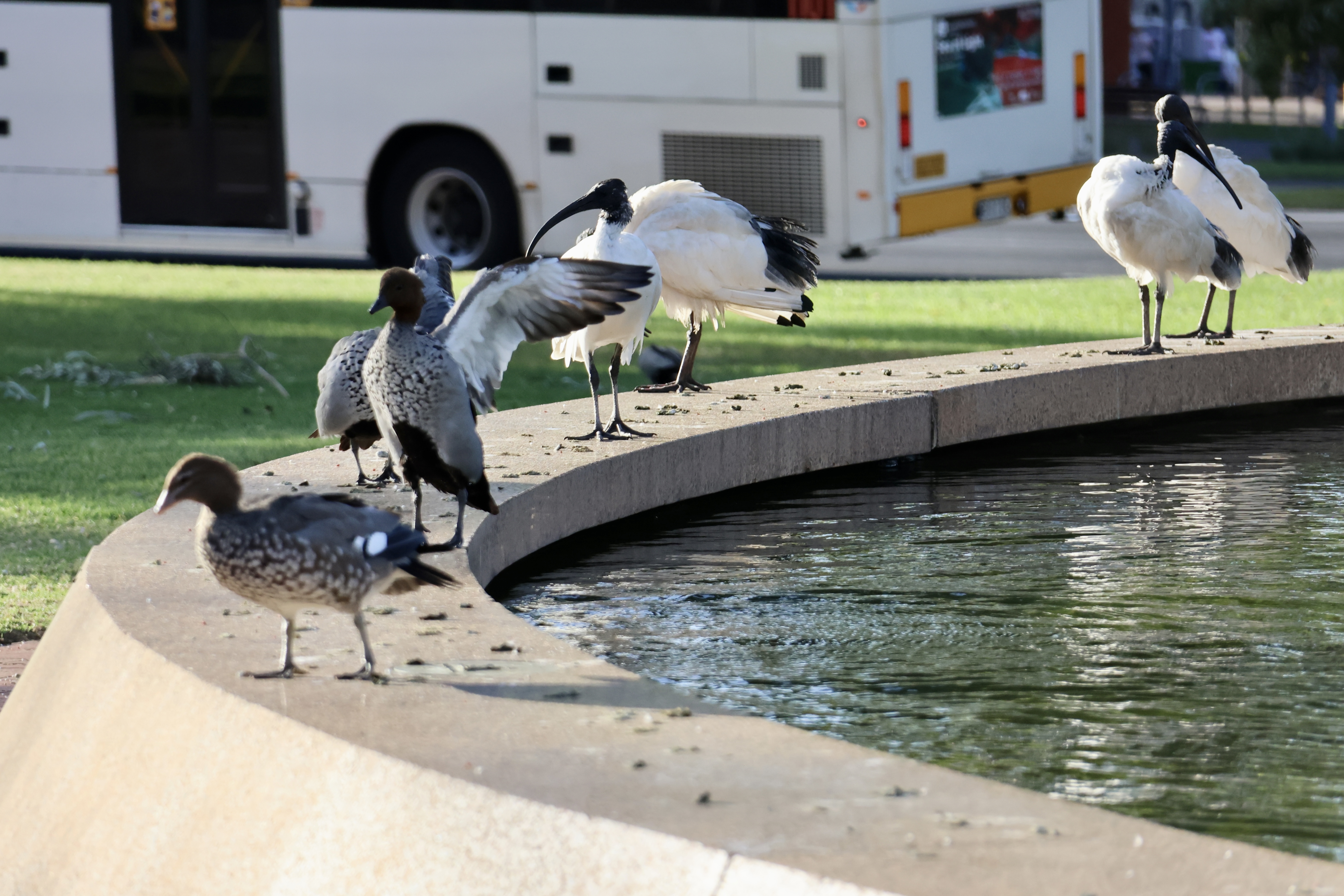
Australian wood ducks and white ibises near the William Light monument in Light Square

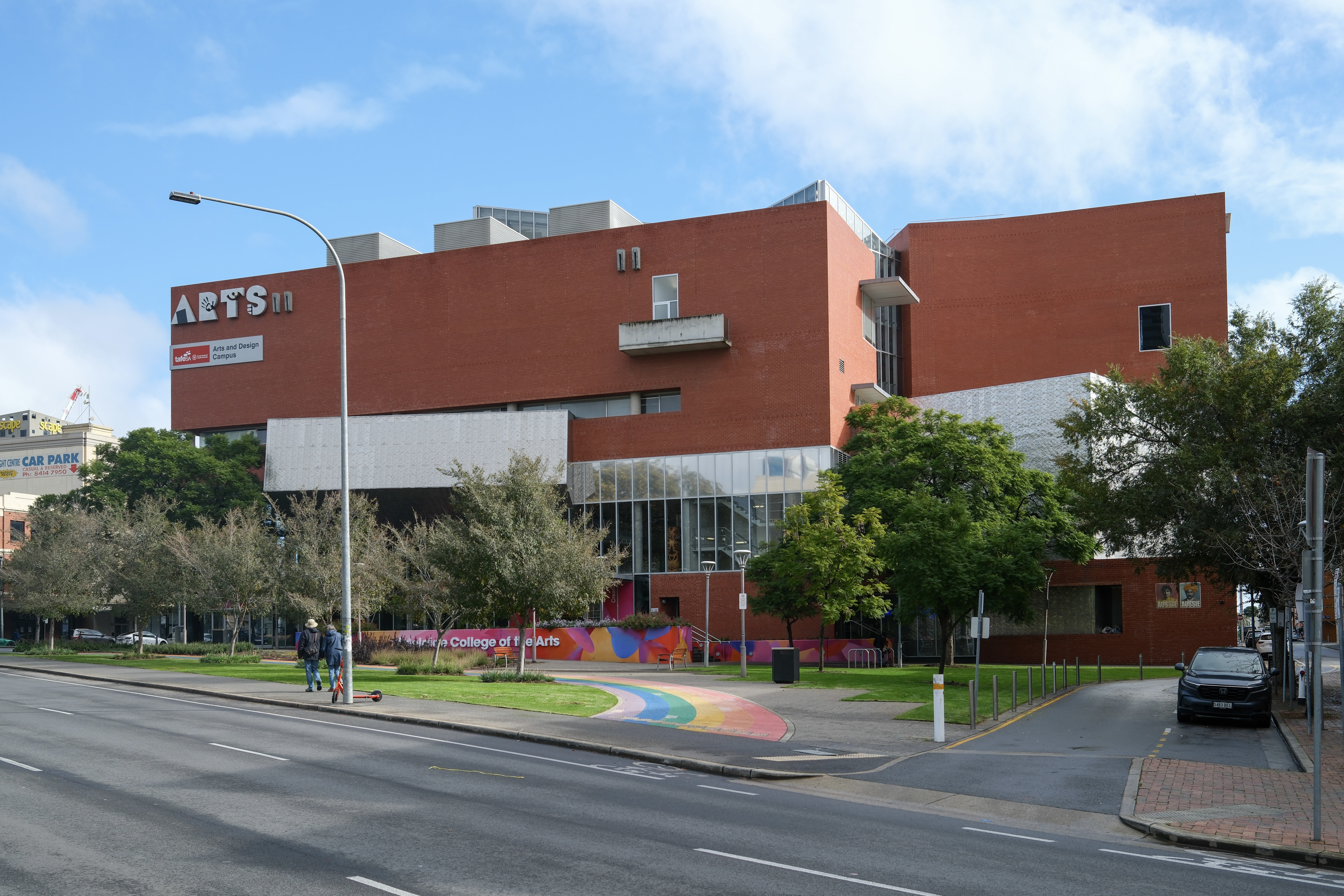
AC Arts building with the Pride Walk in the foreground at Light Square

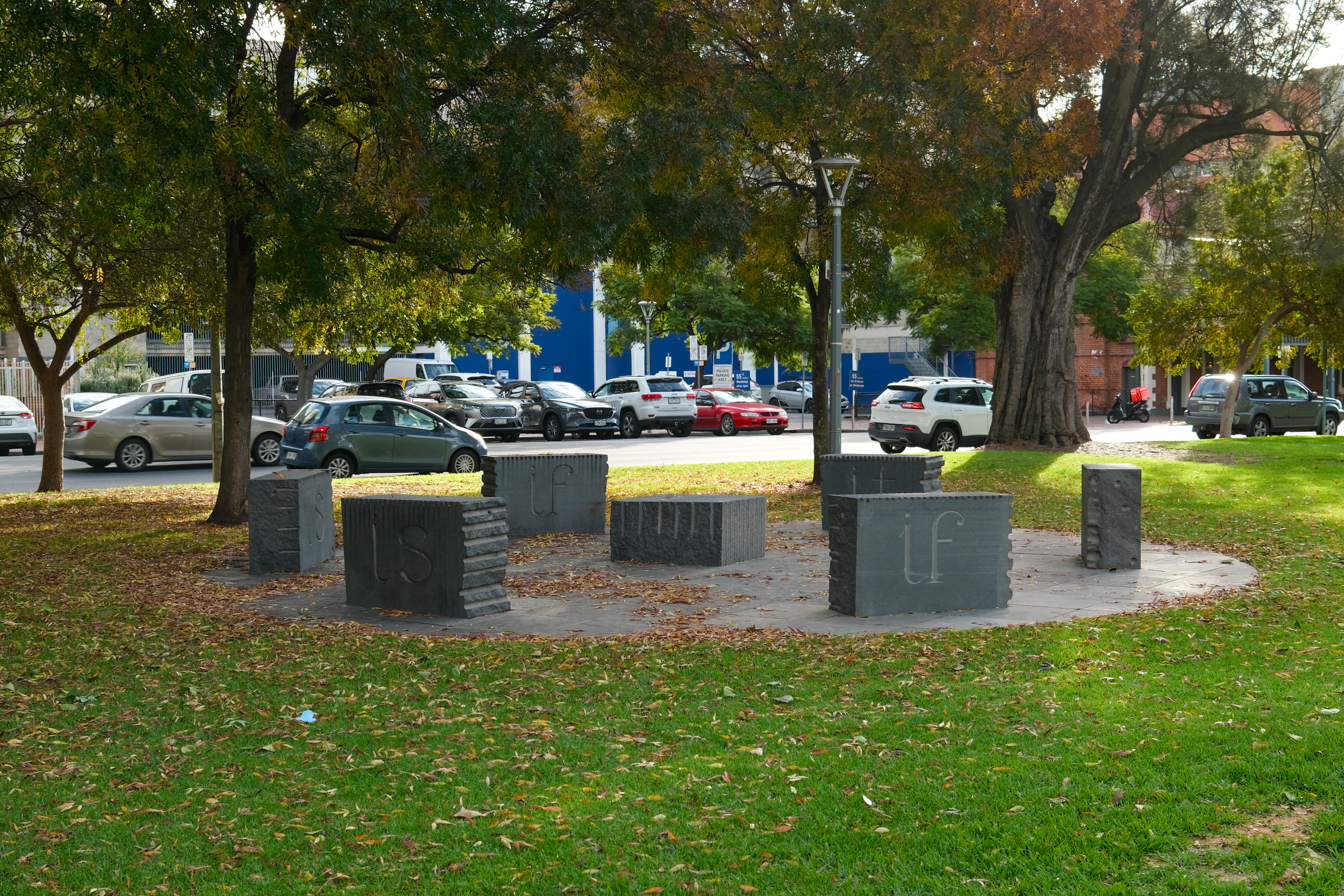
Eternal Question sculpture in Light Square

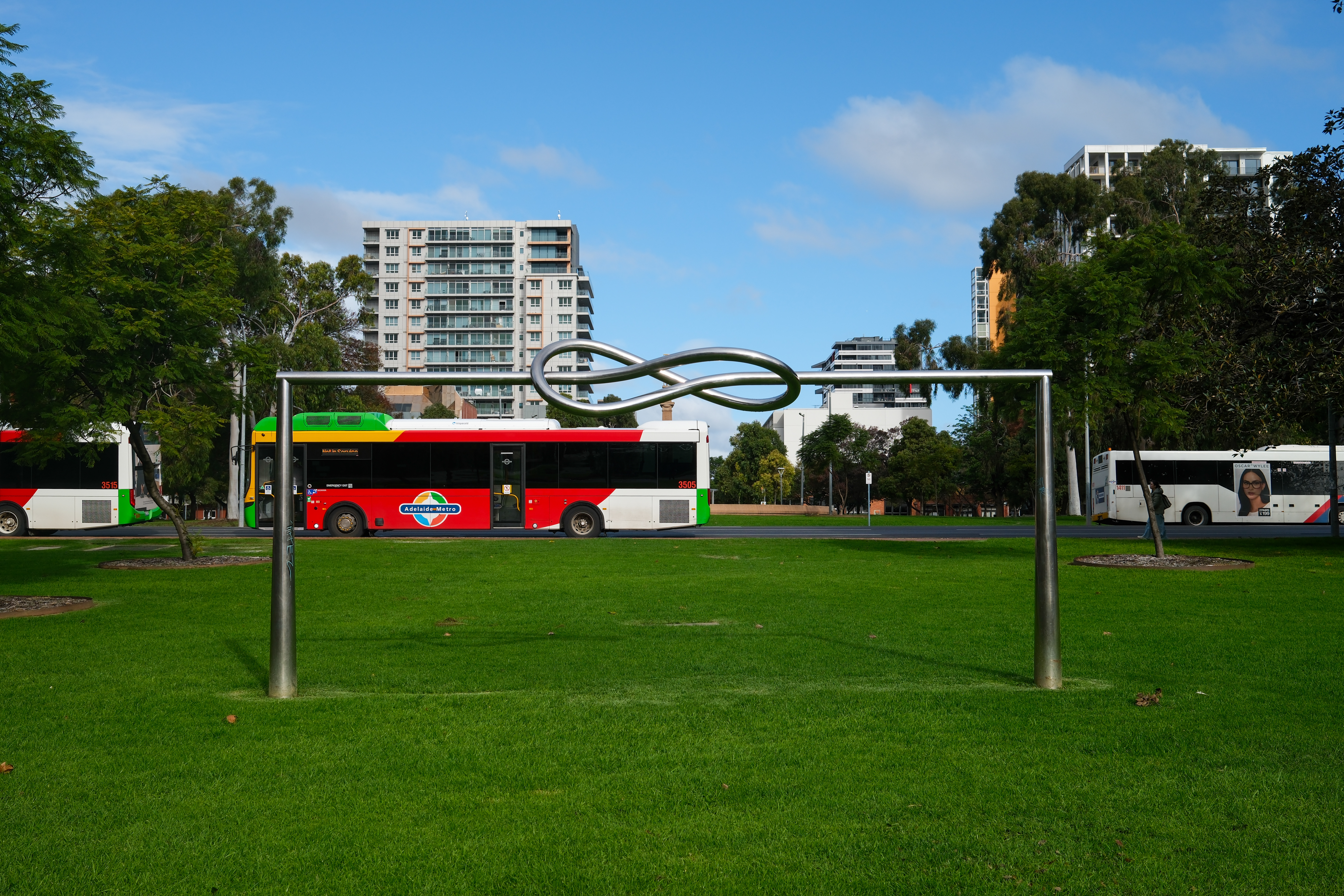
Knot sculpture looking southwards into Light Square
