= Raikes Currie =

Member of the United Kingdom Parliament

Member of Parliament for Northampton
- In office 24 July 1837 – 27 March 1857
- Preceded by: Charles Ross
- Succeeded by: Charles Gilpin

Personal details
- Born: 15 April 1801
- Died: 16 October 1881 (aged 80)
- Children: George Wodehouse Currie; Bertram Wodehouse Currie; Maynard Wodehouse Currie; Philip Wodehouse Currie

Raikes Currie (15 April 1801 – 16 October 1881) was Member of Parliament (MP) for Northampton from 1837 to 1857. He was a partner of the bank Curries & Co., which became part of Glyn, Mills & Co. in 1864, along with his father, Isaac Currie, in Cornhill, City of London, and had several interests in the newly developing colony of South Australia. He restored Minley Manor and made substantial improvements to the estate, work which was continued by his son and grandson.

The family bank was connected to slavery in the British West Indies and contributed some £9,000 (possibly as much as £50,000) to the creation of South Australia in 1836.

== Family ==
His father, Isaac Currie (1760–1843), of Bush Hill, Middlesex, England, was a senior partner of the bank Curries & Co. and the son of William Currie, Distiller and Banker, of Gatton Park, Surrey. Currie and his sons were financially connected to slavery and benefited from compensation awarded to slaveholders upon the emancipation of slavery in the 1830s.

The Curries belonged to an old Scottish family descended directly from the Curries of Duns, Berwickshire. His mother, Mary Anne Raikes, was the daughter of William Raikes and granddaughter of Robert Raikes, printer and newspaper proprietor. Her uncles included Thomas Raikes, Governor of the Bank of England from 1797 to 1799 and personal friend of William Wilberforce, the leader of the campaign against the slave trade; and Robert Raikes, the founder of Sunday schools. Her brother Job Mathew Raikes was married to Charlotte Bayly, daughter of Nathaniel Bayly, MP, and colonial plantation owner in Jamaica.

On 28 June 1825 Raikes Currie married the Hon. Laura Sophia Wodehouse, with whom he had four sons and two daughters. She was a daughter of John Wodehouse, 2nd Baron Wodehouse of Kimberley, and Sophia Berkeley. Their four sons were George Wodehouse Currie (1826–), Bertram Raikes Wodehouse Currie (1827–1896), the Reverend Maynard Wodehouse Currie (1829–1887) and Philip Henry Wodehouse Currie (1834–1908), 1st Baron Currie of Hawley.

William Currie of East Horsley, Member of Parliament for Gatton, was his uncle and Vice-Admiral Mark John Currie and Sir Frederick Currie were his cousins.

== Minley Manor ==
Currie's home was at Minley Manor, near Blackwater and Hawley, in Hampshire, England. He bought the land in 1846 and, as the manor house and the estate needed attention, commissioned Henry Clutton to design a new house, which was built between 1858 and 1860. During the next three years attention turned to the estate, with the creation of formal gardens around the house and a kitchen garden. The remainder was landscaped as pleasure gardens by F W Meyer, working with the horticulturists Veitch & Sons of Exeter. On Raikes' death, his son Bertram continued the development, employing Messrs Veitch to lay out a Winter Garden and extensions to the pleasure gardens, which included Hawley Lake. Grandson Laurence Currie built a water tower, created a new complex of walled gardens and further extended the ornamental planting and woodland.

== Political and other activities ==
Currie was elected as MP for Northampton at the 1837 general election, and held the seat until he stood down twenty years later at the 1857 general election. He was a Whig and took an active part in debates and committees. He made contributions to debates on banking and currency and South Australia. He was a vigorous supporter of his party and on one occasion made a long speech chastising the leader of his party for crossing the floor and supporting the Tory party. In 1847 he served on the committee of the British Relief Association.

In 1849, with Richard Cobden and Lord Dudley Stuart, Currie offered financial aid and support in Parliament for the stream of Hungarian émigrés who arrived in England in the wake of the Hungarian Revolution of 1848 as the forces of repression in Hungary intensified.

Currie was a founder director of the South Australian Company and a director of the Van Diemen's Land Company. He was also a Member of the Provisional Committee of the South Australian Association and of the South Australia Literary and Scientific Association. He was one of four donors in 1859 of the Silver Bowl from which the annual Adelaide City Council 'toast to Colonel Light' is drunk.

He was a religious man and was Treasurer of the South Australian District Committee of the Incorporated Society for the Propagation of the Gospel in Foreign Parts. As a member of the South Australian Church Society, Currie befriended and supported Charles Beaumont Howard, who had been appointed colonial chaplain to South Australia and was one of the first settlers in Adelaide.

Currie started an important collection of books, manuscripts and works of art, which was considerably enlarged by his son Bertram and grandson Laurence. "... this eclectic collection embraced everything from Dresden porcelain, English portraits and clocks, and Italian old masters, to the French Decorative Arts of the eighteenth century". Some of the paintings, including a portrait by Peter Paul Rubens of the Marchesa Brigida Spinola Doria, are now in the National Gallery of Art, Washington, DC, USA.

== Later life and death ==
The 1881 British Census found him at Minley Manor with his son Philip, his daughter Mary and her husband William Deacon, his niece Laura Wodehouse and 14 servants.

He died on 16 October 1881 at age 80.

== Legacy ==
Currie Street, Adelaide is named after Raikes Currie.

Parliament of the United Kingdom
Preceded by Charles Ross; Robert Vernon	Member of Parliament for Northampton; 1837 – 1857; With: Robert Vernon	Succeeded by Charles Gilpin; Robert Vernon
