= South Australian Church Society =

The South Australian Church Society was a British-based organisation concerned with the establishment of churches in the new colony of South Australia. The committee (in 1836) included William Wolryche-Whitmore, Raikes Currie, Pascoe St Leger Grenfell, John Morphett, John Shaw Lefevre, John Rundle and others — and had very strong connections and overlap with the Directors and Commissioners of the South Australia Company. Their key success was the formation and construction of the Trinity Church on the corner of North Terrace and Morphett Street. The Honorary Secretary was Charles Mann and Raikes Currie as Treasurer.

The 1856 committee consisted of archbishop Rev. W. J. Woodcock, Rev. Pollitt of Kooringa, Rev. Burnett of Willunga, Rev. Bagshaw of Clare, Rev Coombs of Gawler Town, Rev Newenham of Mount Barker, Rev Fulford of St Mary's on the Sturt, and S. P. R. Allom (second master of the Collegiate School), Messrs. Marshall Macdermott, G. S. Walters, W. Barbey, J. Hart, F. Wicksteed, S. Stocks. Sir Henry Young, the lieutenant governor, was the chairman.
