= Street Naming Committee =

Place names committee for Adelaide, Australia

The Street Naming Committee was a committee established to decide on names for the streets of the new city of Adelaide in the colony of South Australia in 1837.

== Description ==
The Street Naming Committee was set up to decide the names of the streets, the squares and the river of the new settlement of Adelaide, as it had been laid out by Colonel William Light in 1837. Light's map corresponds to the modern Adelaide city centre and North Adelaide. The committee met on 23 May 1837 and chose the names, which were gazetted on 3 June. The committee was not harmonious, with Governor John Hindmarsh in particular taking exception to some of the names. Some of his alterations were included in the final gazetted version.

The names are of prominent pioneers or people who otherwise made some notable contribution to the founding of South Australia, many of whom never actually visited or lived in the colony. Some exceptions are due to Governor Hindmarsh and Judge Jeffcott wishing to name streets after their friends. Strangways Terrace was named after Thomas Bewes Strangways, a committee member who was also a prospective son-in-law to the Governor. Pulteney Street was named after Admiral Sir Pulteney Malcolm who had recommended that Hindmarsh be appointed first Governor of the colony. More controversially, Archer Street was to have been named Willoughby Street, after Sir Henry Willoughby, a British MP who had initially opposed the South Australia Bill, but was later won over and convinced others also to change their votes. Through the Governor's interference, the name was changed to Archer, after a landowner who had given him some sheep. O'Connell Street and Kermode Street were named after Jeffcott's friends Daniel O'Connell, who had defended him over a duel, and Robert Kermode, the brother of his fiancée.

With a very few exceptions, the original names have been retained, although a large number of streets have since been added, particularly in the city centre. Brown Street and Hanson Street have been subsumed into Morphett Street and Pulteney Street respectively. Roberts Place has been renamed Sir Edwin Smith Avenue.

== Committee members ==
The Street Naming Committee comprised:

Governor John Hindmarsh	Judge Sir John Jeffcott
James Hurtle Fisher, first Resident Commissioner	Robert Gouger, first Colonial Secretary
Colonel William Light, Surveyor-General	John Brown, Immigration Officer
Osmond Gilles, Colonial Treasurer	Thomas Gilbert, Colonial Storekeeper
John Morphett	John Barton Hack
Edward Stephens (cashier and accountant of the South Australian Company)	Thomas Bewes Strangways

== See also ==
- Adelaide city centre § Street and square names
- South Australian Company
