= Spencer Skipper =

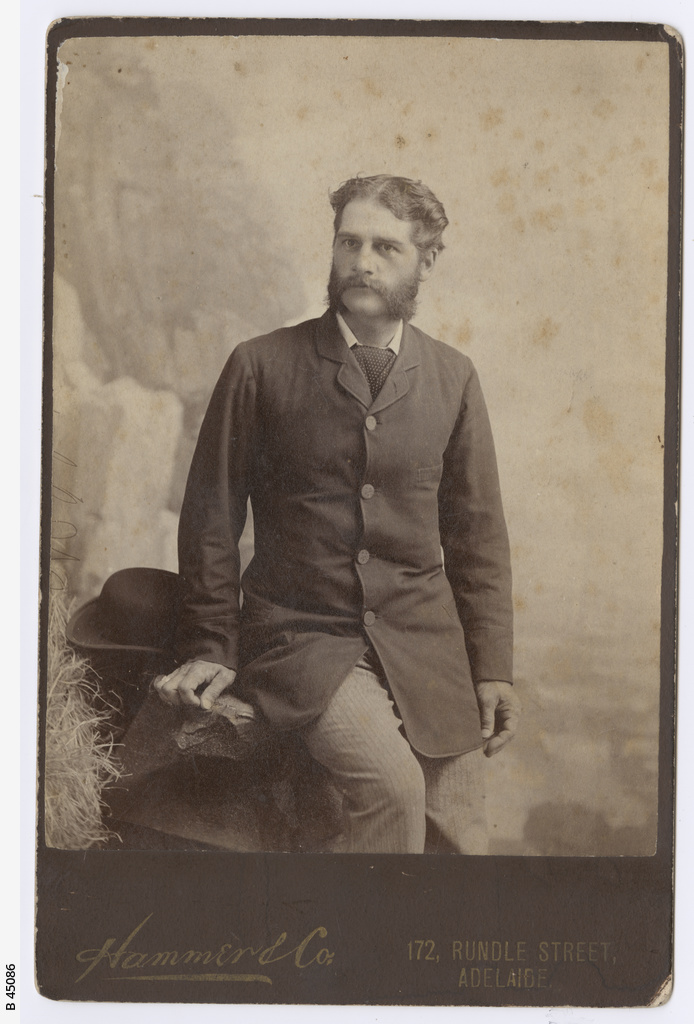
- Skipper c. 1880
- Born: Spencer John Skipper; 21 May 1847; Adelaide
- Died: 8 September 1903 (aged 56); Rose Park, South Australia
- Other name: Hugh Kalyptus
- Occupation: Journalist
- Spouse: Frances Emma Cox (m. 1878)

Spencer John Skipper (c. 1848 – September 1903) was a journalist in South Australia who wrote and drew using the pseudonym "Hugh Kalyptus".

== History ==
Skipper was born in South Australia a son of solicitor and artist John Michael Skipper (18 June 1815 – 7 December 1883) and his wife Frances Amelia Skipper, née Thomas (c. 1818 – 27 February 1855), whose father was Robert Thomas, founding editor of the South Australian Register.

His parents both emigrated to South Australia aboard Africaine and married at the end of 1839. Around January 1837 his father painted the scene of the Proclamation of South Australia, to which he had been a witness. It shows The Old Gum Tree and Gouger's tent and hut, supporting the conventional view that the bent tree is the genuine site of the ceremony.

He was educated at John Lorenzo Young's Adelaide Educational Institution and studied for the Law. He was an occasional contributor to the E. R. Mitford's satirical magazine Pasquin (1867–1870), using the nom de plume "Unowho".

He worked for The Portonian from 1871 to 1879 alongside John Eden Savill, better known as a racehorse owner.

He joined the literary staff of The Register, and after the death of shipping reporter Richard Jagoe in 1894, he was appointed to that position, which he held until a few weeks before his death. An avid member of the Volunteer Force, he was also the unofficial reporter on the peacetime activities of South Australia's militia. He also served as the paper's arts critic.

Skipper was associated with John Howard Clark, whose clever satirical column "Echoes from the Bush by Geoffry Crabthorn", which ran from 1867 to 1878, he emulated in his own satirical column "Echoes and Re-Echoes" in The Evening Journal and The Adelaide Observer under the nom de plume "Hugh Kalyptus" from 1882 to 1903. That pen name was from 1910 occasionally used by Adam Cairns McCay of the Sydney Sun.

Skipper's memory was kept alive by his son M. G. Skipper of The Bulletin, but his adulation was undeserved according to one critic, who found his humour "amateurish, very thin and quite dull. He was a hard-working useful hack of considerable intelligence".

== Selected writing ==
- My Deutscher Brother, a tribute to South Australia's German immigrants

== Other activities ==
- He was involved in various sports, notably yachting, cycling, and rifle shooting.
- He was a member of the local artillery.
- In 1875 he was a founder, with Capts. Gray and Scott, of the Rifle Volunteer Force
- He was secretary of the Old Colonists' Association for many years.

== Family ==
In 1878 Skipper married Frances Emma Cox (c. 1855–1933), a daughter of Christopher Cox, at one time Mayor of Gawler. Their children were:

- (Herbert) Stanley Skipper, a.k.a. S. H. Skipper (1880–1962) studied law at the Adelaide University; member of Modern Pickwick Club, admitted to the Bar, and was managing partner of Gordon, Anderson & Bright, of Port Adelaide.
- Estella Berenice Skipper (1881–1980) married Harry Arthur Stanes and moved to Western Australia
- Myrtle Kyffin Skipper (1884– ) married Henry Arthur Gladstone Cook in Western Australia.
- Mervyn Garnham Skipper (1886–1958), with the Eastern Extension Telegraph Company in Borneo. He was author of The White Man's Garden and The Meeting Pool and worked for The Bulletin in Melbourne.

For many years they had a home in Semaphore, then moved to Hewitt Avenue, Rose Park.
