= Robert Thomas (newspaper proprietor) =

Australian newspaper publisher (1781–1860)

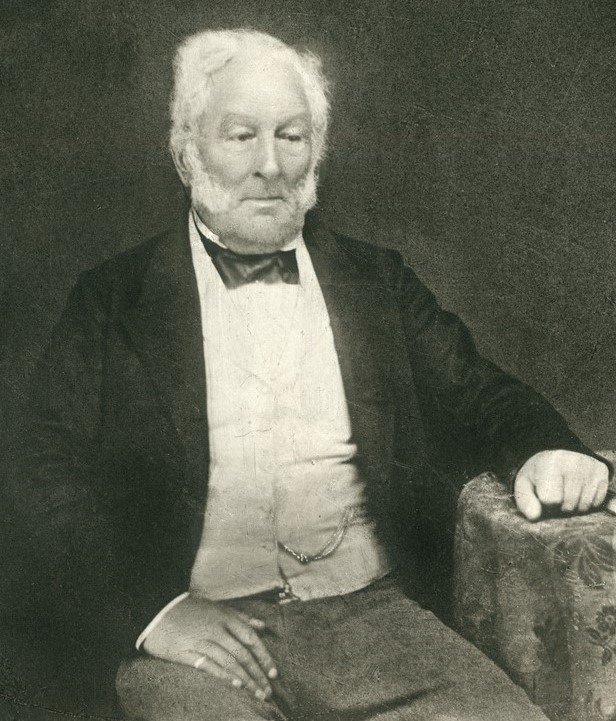

Robert Thomas (November 1781 – 1 July 1860) was a Welsh newspaper proprietor, printer and early settler of South Australia who was born on a farm 'Rhantregynwen', at Llanymynech, Powys, Wales.

In 1836, Thomas migrated to the new colony with his wife Mary and family on the Africaine, arriving at Holdfast Bay on 8 November. He printed Governor Hindmarsh's proclamation of the new colony (28 December 1836). On 27 and 28 March 1837 he purchased from the South Australian Company, at auction, numerous plots of land as surveyed by Colonel Light in the new capital: Town Acres Nos. 41 on the north side of Rundle Street; 51, 56, and 58 on the north side of Hindley Street; 82 on the south side of Rundle Street; and in North Adelaide Nos. 729 on Brougham Place, and 891 and 893 on Burton Street. Town Acre No. 56 would be the site of his first printery, where the first issue of the South Australian Gazette and Colonial Register was printed on 3 June 1837. By 1838, the Register was a weekly newspaper. He also published the weekly Adelaide Chronicle and South Australian Literary Record (27 May 1840 – 18 May 1842).

Thomas also printed copies of the South Australian Church Hymn Book for the Rev. Charles Howard, the Royal South Australian Almanac (1838-1842) and from 1839, the Port Lincoln Herald and South Australian Commercial Advertiser.

The Register had a fierce policy of independence and this resulted in conflict with Governor George Gawler, who it often criticised for his economic policies. Gawler was particularly attacked in September 1840 over his ordering of the execution of two Ngarrindjeri men as a reprisal for the killing and dismembering of the survivors of the Maria shipwreck on the Coorong the previous July. As a result, the Government ceased to use the services of Robert Thomas & Co. from 11 November 1840 as Government printer, especially of the Government Gazette – a loss to the company of £1650 a year.

After an unsuccessful trip to London to protest the loss of business from the Government, he returned to Adelaide, where he continued to be involved in further printing and publishing. He died on 1 July 1860 at his home in Hindley Street.

== Family ==
His wife Mary Thomas, née Harris (30 August 1787 – 10 February 1875) was a poet and diarist, who published The Diary of Mary Thomas, which is considered a valuable history of her voyage on the Africaine and the early days of the colony. Children aboard Africaine were:

- Frances Amelia Thomas (c. 1818 – 27 February 1855) married solicitor and artist John Michael Skipper (18 June 1815 – 7 December 1883) on 28 December 1840. He married again, to Mary Thomas (c. 1813 – 28 April 1883) on 28 April 1856.

- Spencer John Skipper (c. 1848 – September 1903), journalist remembered as "Hugh Kalyptus" of the Register.

- William Kyffin Thomas (1821–1878), became a proprietor of the South Australian Register.
- Mary Thomas (c. 1823 – 28 April 1883) married her sister's widower John Michael Skipper (c. 1817 – 7 December 1883) on 28 April 1856
- Helen Thomas (6 July 1825 – 17 August 1921) married Swiss pianist Alfredo Placido "Alfred" Mantegani (1829 – 5 June 1861) on 25 June 1855.

- Teresa Victoria Mantegani (c. 1856 – 19 Jun 1937) married Miles Horatio Beevor in 1878
- Alfred Victor Mantegani (c. 1859 – 24 Aug 1926) married Ellen Deveny in 1898

Another son, Robert George Thomas, (16 February 1820 – 14 April 1883) arrived with G. S. Kingston, aboard Cygnet in 1836, worked as a surveyor (he drafted the original plan of the City of Adelaide), then in 1846 returned to England. He was back in Adelaide in 1861 and served for a time as later Government Architect before reverting to private practice.
