= John Finlay Duff =

John Finlay Duff (1 April 1799 – 18 May 1868) was a ship's captain and businessman in the Colony of South Australia.

== History ==
Duff was born in Dundee, Scotland in 1799, son of John Duff and his wife Elisabeth, née Finlay, of a ship owning family. He qualified as a master mariner and first reached Australia in July 1835, when he captained the Africaine from London to Hobart.

On his next voyage to Australia, the barque Africaine left London Docks on 28 June, but without Captain Duff, who was to be married the next day at St Botolph's Aldgate. The newlyweds joined the ship, anchored in The Downs off Deal, Kent, on the following day. Witness to the wedding was his friend and business partner John Hallett, who with his family were among migrants on Africaine migrants. The ship, which had been chartered by Robert Gouger and John Brown with around 60 emigrants and a considerable cargo bound for South Australia on what has been dubbed the "First Fleet of South Australia", had an uneventful voyage and on 1 November 1836 were off the coast of Kangaroo Island, near Cape Borda.

A small party asked to be put ashore, intending to hike along the north of the island to Nepean Bay, but they found the going much more difficult than Sutherland's 1819 memoir led them to expect, with little food and water to be had. Mr. Osborne took ill and could proceed no further; Dr. Slater stayed with him, and both presumably perished, though if found, their bodies were never identified. Ten days after they set foot on the island the remainder, Nantes, Warren, Bagg and Fisher, reached the settlement at Kingscote, where they were hospitably received by Samuel Stephens and Dr. Wright, other employees of the South Australian Company and fellow-passenger John Hallett, who had been searching for them the better part of the previous week. Finding their ship gone, at least one of the exploration party, Robert Fisher, was critical of Duff for not waiting longer for them.

Africaine left for the mainland on 6 November, Duff having decided not to wait any longer, encountered William Light's brig Rapid at Rapid Bay, and Light was welcomed aboard Africaine, then moved on to Holdfast Bay, arriving before the Buffalo. Duff was immediately commissioned to set sail for Hobart for urgently needed supplies, incidentally making useful business contacts in Van Diemen's Land.

Duff and Hallett, who were both part-owners of Africaine with Thomas Finlay (perhaps Duff's maternal grandfather), opened a store and shipping agency on Grenfell Street in 1837, one of the first in the Colony. Their residences were both on South Terrace, Adelaide, almost adjacent; Duff moved from South Terrace around the end of 1846.

They dissolved their partnership in December 1840. Both had substantial land holdings; Duff purchased one of the original town acres at the corner of Currie Street and West Terrace and larger properties near the city. He allowed his farmer tenants to pay their rent in bags of wheat. He donated part of his property "Woodford", near Magill, for St. George's Anglican Church. They had other properties further out: at Port Lincoln, and "Woodford" on the Para River, where he ran sheep. In 1837 he exported in four bales of wool to England – the first from South Australia. Duff and Hallett were early and generous contributors to the establishment of Trinity Church.

In 1838 Duff and his wife returned to England, where their first child was born, and was christened at the church where they had been married (she was to be christened a second time, as Jessie Light Duff at Trinity Church, North Terrace, Adelaide, in honour of Colonel William Light). They returned to South Australia as fellow-passengers on the Asia with Dr. George Mayo, with whom he developed a long-lasting friendship, arriving in July 1839.

Duff owned the schooner Waterwitch, usually commanded by D. Talbert, which traded between Mauritius, Bourbon and Port Adelaide, also between Port Adelaide and Fremantle, Western Australia. She was lost with all hands on a return voyage which left Mauritius on 28 August September 1846. He also owned the barque Guiana, which he took to Mauritius twice, and the Augustus which he also commanded on several Mauritius voyages.

In 1859, Captain Duff accepted the appointment of Harbourmaster and Lightkeeper at Glenelg, which he held for several years. One of his first duties was to decide on the suitability of Cape Willoughby for a lighthouse.

He died at his home at New Glenelg, and was buried at West Terrace Cemetery. Robert Gouger thought very highly of him, noting that "… he appears to be a thorough sailor, decisive and skilful; he pays equal attention to all his passengers, has no favorites apparently, and therefore is a general favorite." Light was also fulsome in his praise for Duff's seamanship and judgment.

The Duff SA Voyages
Ship	Departure	Port	Arrival	Notes
Africaine		London	6 November 1836	part of the First Fleet of South Australia
Africaine		Hobart	30 January 1837	
Africaine		Launceston	14 July 1837	
Sir Charles McCarthy		Launceston	8 October 1837	wrecked at Glenelg November 1837
Asia		London	16 July 1839	
Waterwitch	3 March 1840	Launceston		
Guiana		Mauritius	27 July 1842	first cargo landed at the new port
Augustus	21 March 1844	Sydney	16 June 1844	misreported as bound for Mauritius
Guiana	16 August 1844	Mauritius	8 February 1845	
Guiana		Hobart	4 April 1846	
Augustus	5 February 1847	Mauritius	26 June 1847	
Augustus	13 July 1847	Hobart	16 September 1847	
Augustus		Mauritius	13 July 1848	
Augustus		Hobart	23 November 1848	

== Family ==
Duff married Anna? Anne? Eliza Turner ( – 22 November 1854) on 29 June 1836. Their children included:

- Jessie Light Duff (29 November 1838 – ) married William S. Miller of Parkside on 4 September 1861
- John Finlay Duff, Jr.(4 December 1843 – October 1897) lived at Glenelg. He died at Argyle Downs Station. W.A.
- Eliza Dixon Duff (c. 1848 – 18 August 1921) married John W. Stafford ( – ) on 13 May 1871

He married again, to Mary Schroder ( – ) on 24 April 1862. He died six years later. Their children included:

- Joseph Stilling Duff (1863 – 21 January 1920) married Adelaide Lurina Capper in 1886. He was a theatre manager and accountant, died in Wellington, New Zealand.
- Stuart Duncan Duff (1866 – 17 June 1941) married Mabel Annie Shephard on 6 April 1898, lived at Marion, then Brighton.
