= William Light =

British military officer and colonial administrator (1786-1839)

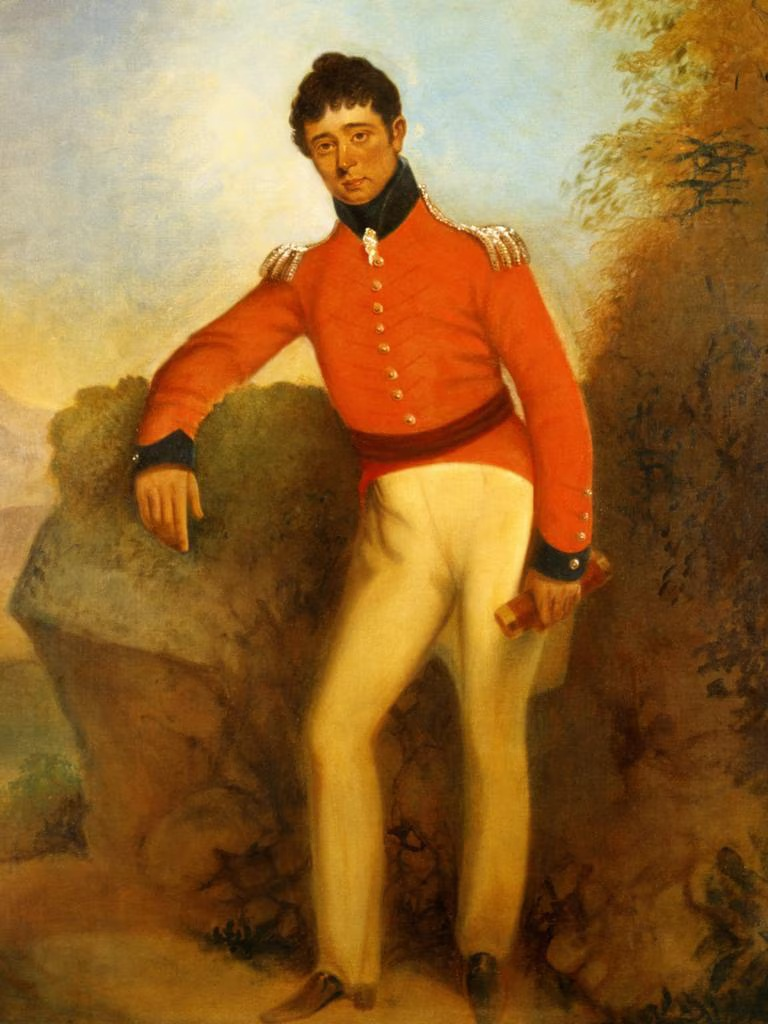
- Self-portrait, c. 1815

Surveyor General of South Australia
- In office 28 December 1836 – 21 June 1838
- Preceded by: office established
- Succeeded by: George Owen Ormsby (acting)

Personal details
- Born: 27 April 1786 Kuala Kedah, Kedah (now in Malaysia)
- Died: 6 October 1839 (aged 53) Adelaide, South Australia
- Parent(s): Francis Light and Martinha Rozells
- Occupation: Surveyor, town planner, military officer
- Known for: Planning the city of Adelaide

Military service
- Allegiance: Great Britain; United Kingdom; Spanish Liberals
- Branch/service: Royal Navy; British Army; Spanish militia
- Years of service: 1799–1823
- Rank: Brevet Major (United Kingdom); Lieutenant colonel (Spain)
- Unit: 4th Dragoons; 3rd Regiment of Foot; Vigo militia
- Battles/wars: French Revolutionary Wars; Napoleonic Wars; Peninsular War; Battle of Orthez; Battle of Tarbes; Battle of Toulouse (1814); Royalist War

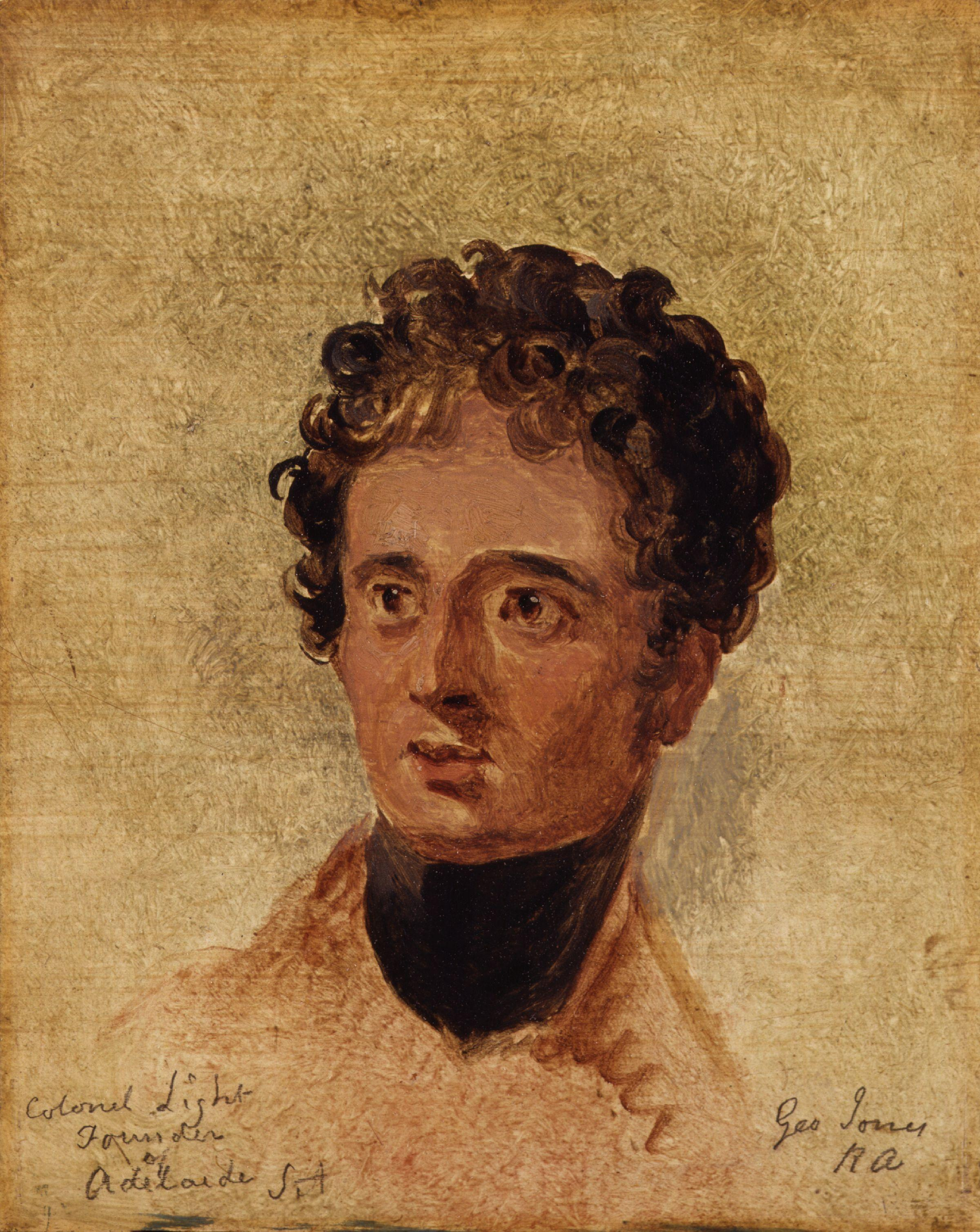
William Light, Founder of Adelaide, SA, by George Jones RA, National Portrait Gallery, London.

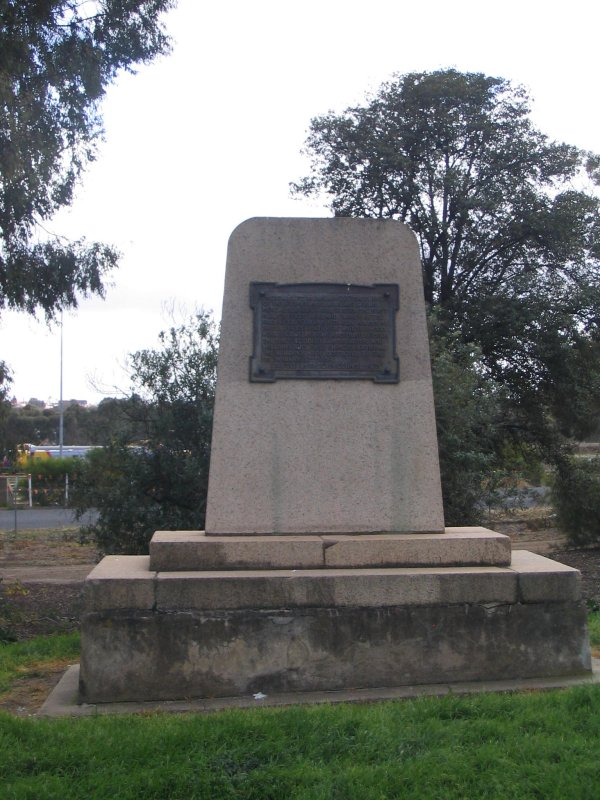
Survey monument in its original location. (Plaque detail)

William Light, Sicilian Scenery, 1823

Lieutenant-Colonel William Light (27 April 1786 – 6 October 1839) was a British military officer and colonial administrator. He was the first Surveyor-General of the new British Province of South Australia, known for choosing the site of the colony's capital, Adelaide, and for designing the layout of its streets, six city squares, gardens and the figure-eight Adelaide Park Lands, in a plan later sometimes referred to as Light's Vision.

== Early life and education ==
William Light was born in Kuala Kedah, Kedah (now in Malaysia), on 27 April 1786, the eldest son of Francis Light, the founder and superintendent of Penang, and Martinha (or Martina) Rozells, who was of Portuguese or French, and Siamese or Malay descent. He was thus legally classed as Eurasian, an ethnic designation which granted the designated a middle position between the natives and the Europeans. He was baptised on 31 December 1786.

He lived in Penang until the age of six (1793), when he was sent to Theberton, a village in Suffolk, England, to be educated by friends of his father. These friends were George Doughty, Sheriff of Suffolk, and his wife Anne. He never saw his parents again. His father died in October 1794, and although providing generously for his son's education, Light did not inherit his father's considerable wealth, as the estate had been ruined by maladministration. He became attached to the Doughtys, and later named his house in Adelaide after the family home. He was well educated, and soon became proficient in French, as well as showing a talent for drawing, watercolour painting and music. He became known in London as a rich East Indian, and attended the court of the Prince of Wales, later King George IV.

== Military career, first marriage, travel ==
In 1799 Light volunteered for the Royal Navy at the age of 13, serving in the navy for two years before leaving at the rank of midshipman. He became civilian internee in France following the outbreak of the Napoleonic Wars in May 1803 but escaped from internment in Verdun on 5 January 1804. Light subsequently went to India and attended his sister Mary's wedding to the indigo plantation owner George Boyd in Calcutta in March 1805. (Note: Steurt's great-grandmother.) Light remained in India until November 1806, when he returned to Europe. On 5 May 1808, Light purchased a cornet's commission in the British Army's 4th (Queen's Own) Regiment of Dragoons, and was promoted to lieutenant in April 1809 en route to Lisbon to serve in the Peninsular War.

In the Iberian Peninsula, he learnt basic Spanish and served in more than 40 engagements without being wounded once. In November 1812, Light became the deputy assistant quartermaster to Colonel George Murray at the headquarters of General Arthur Wellesley, 1st Marquess of Wellington, where Light was employed on mapping, reconnaissance and liaison duties. Becoming a favourite of Wellington, Light fought in the battles of Orthez, Tarbes and Toulouse during the campaign in south-west France in early 1814. In November 1814, Light purchased the rank of captain in the 3rd (East Kent) Regiment of Foot and was on half-pay during the Battle of Waterloo, which he just missed. Following the battle, Light returned to England and spent a period of time travelling throughout Europe. In 1819, he returned to active service and served in the Channel Islands, Scotland and Ireland.

Light resigned from the army at the brevet rank of major in 1821 and married E. Perois in Derry on 24 May of that year. He proceeded to move in literary and artistic circles in Paris, Mainland Italy and Sicily for several years, during which his wife died. In 1823, he returned to Spain to fight against France's invasion of the country as aide-de-camp to Sir Robert Wilson, who had raised an international force to help the Spanish Liberals against Ferdinand VII of Spain and his French allies. Light and Wilson both voluntarily enlisted in the Vigo militia at the rank of private, and the former was promoted to lieutenant colonel. When French troops attacked Corunna, Light was badly wounded and captured, though his life was spared due to the intercession of a French officer.

== Second marriage, travel ==
Returning to England in 1824, Light met and fell in love with the beautiful and wealthy 19-year-old Mary Bennet, illegitimate daughter of the 3rd Duke of Richmond, in the London studio of the miniature painter Charlotte Jones. After a whirlwind romance, they married on 16 October 1824. They travelled to Europe, spending a couple of years in France, Switzerland and Italy (mainly Rome), where Light published his Views of Pompeii in 1828. Light returned to England, where he bought a yacht, Gulnare, after which the couple cruised the Mediterranean for some years. In 1830 they went to Egypt, where Light first met promoters of a new colony in Australia. Light made numerous sketches and Mary studied Egyptology while in Egypt, becoming a friend and keen correspondent of Egyptologist John Gardner Wilkinson. The couple became friends with Muhammad Ali, Pasha and founder of modern Egypt.

Light sailed for England in 1831 in his own yacht to help recruit British men for the Pasha's navy. The process became prolonged, and Light stayed in England until 1835, while Mary continued her studies, travelling to Thebes for a second time and writing detailed journals of her travels and discoveries. Light separated from Mary in 1832, after she had formed a relationship with another officer. The couple never divorced, and Mary retained the surname Light for herself and three children she had by other men in 1833, 1834 and 1835. (Note: Steurt treads delicately around this matter, suggesting that the three children were "by her first marriage", even though it says elsewhere that Light was in England during these years.)

Light helped Muhammad Ali to establish a modern navy, sailing his own yacht to England to help recruit British men for the Pasha's navy. He captained the paddle steamer the Nile from London to Alexandria to join the Egyptian Navy, reaching Alexandria in September 1834. John Hindmarsh had prepared the steamer for delivery at Blackwall Yard on the River Thames, travelled as a passenger on the ship on its journey to Alexandria, and was made captain of the ship by November.

Light started a relationship with the 21-year-old Maria Gandy (born 23 November 1811), a woman of humble stock, who was his companion for the rest of his life.

== Surveyor-General of South Australia ==
By 1835, negotiations had been completed for the founding of the new British Province of South Australia, according to the scheme of Edward Gibbon Wakefield, intended as a self-supporting free colony.

Light had given Hindmarsh a letter of introduction to Colonel Charles James Napier, who was the recently designated Governor of the new colony. However, Napier was not interested in the position, and upon hearing this, Hindmarsh rushed to London and lobbied for the position, after seeing Napier in Portsmouth in May 1835. Napier recommended to the authorities that Light be given the post of Governor, but Hindmarsh had already been promised it. Light returned to London in January 1836, and on 4 February was appointed Surveyor-General of South Australia instead.

On 1 May 1836, Light sailed for South Australia with Maria Gandy, two of her young brothers (William (19) and Edward (10)), and some of his survey staff, on the survey brig, Rapid, along with the nine other ships in the "First Fleet". The ship reached Kangaroo Island on 17 August 1836. Sailing from Nepean Bay on 23 September, Light started exploring Gulf St Vincent, sailing first past Rapid Bay, then up to Port Adelaide before returning to Rapid Bay. In the meantime Cygnet had arrived at Nepean Bay, Kangaroo Island, with the assistant surveyors. Soon afterwards Africaine arrived, with Colonial Secretary Robert Gouger and other colonial officers anxious to know where the settlement should be situated. Light suggested that the ships land at Holdfast Bay for the meantime, while he went with a group to explore further. The group encountered a group of Indigenous Australians for the first time at Rapid Bay (belonging to one of the Ramindjeri tribes) and was reported to have established a friendly and cooperative relationship with them. After finding the Port River, Light then sailed across to Port Lincoln, on Spencer's Gulf, but found the area unsuitable. In addition to lack of surface water, Light found navigation of Spencer's Gulf and southern entry into Boston Bay more hazardous. On 18 December he decided on the site of Adelaide for the new capital, and headed north to survey the coast 8 mi (13 km) north with a view to its being the site for a harbour. HMS Buffalo arrived at Holdfast Bay on 28 December. That same day Governor Hindmarsh landed and, all pre-requisites having been met, proclaimed the commencement of colonial government (henceforth celebrated as Proclamation Day).

== Designing Adelaide ==
Instructions for Light's role in the expedition "for the purpose of effecting such a survey of the different harbours and the adjoining land as may be necessary to the correct determination of the best site for the first town" were given in a document dated 9 March 1836.

There Light was the first to accurately chart the Port Adelaide River, before selecting the location and designing and laying out the plan of the City of Adelaide. This he did, and managed to plan and found the city in only eight weeks.

=== Location ===
The site chosen by Light spanned the River Torrens, or Karra Wirra Parri, as it was known by the local people. One of the reasons he chose the location was because he observed that the Adelaide Hills would result in higher rainfall on the Adelaide plain. This was a promising indicator of good conditions for avoidance of drought-prone areas. Settlement sites on Encounter Bay, Kangaroo Island, Spencer's Gulf, the West coast of St Vincent's Gulf and Holdfast Bay (now known as Glenelg) had been rejected. The site had many challenges, but Light wrote that he chose the site "because it was on a beautiful and gently rising ground, and formed altogether a better connection with the river than any other place".

Despite the natural advantages of the site, Light faced opposition, mainly from Hindmarsh, who wished to locate the city near the River Murray mouth near Encounter Bay, and some of settlers, who objected to the distance from the port. The opposition to the plan culminated in a meeting on 10 February, at which a letter from Light to Resident Commissioner James Hurtle Fisher outlining the reasons for his choice, praising the good soil, extensive neighbouring plains and sheep grazing, a plentiful year-round supply of excellent fresh water, easy communication with its harbour, proximity to the Murray River, as well as the beauty of the country. The letter included a personal note: "The reasons that led me to fix Adelaide where it is I do not expect to be generally understood or calmly judged of at present. My enemies however, by disputing their validity in every particular, have done me the good service of fixing the whole of the responsibility upon me. I am perfectly willing to bear it, and I leave it to posterity and not to them, to decide whether I am entitled to praise or to blame". An amendment proposed by Dr Wright (Note: See note at First Fleet of South Australia on Dr Edward Wright.) and seconded by Deputy Surveyor George Strickland Kingston upheld Light's selection in March 1837.

After a quarrel between Hindmarsh and Resident Commissioner Fisher, which also drew in other settlers and officials, Colonial Secretary Gouger, one of Light's chief supporters, was suspended and replaced. In December 1837, Judge John Jeffcott was drowned at Encounter Bay (himself being a supporter of Hindmarsh's view and at the time trying to prove the safety of the Bay). Soon after this, Hindmarsh complained formally about the slow progress of the surveys, while at the same time hindering Light's work. Parties explored nearby areas, Light continued with his work on plans, supported by most settlers, and in July of that year, Hindmarsh was recalled.

=== City plan ===
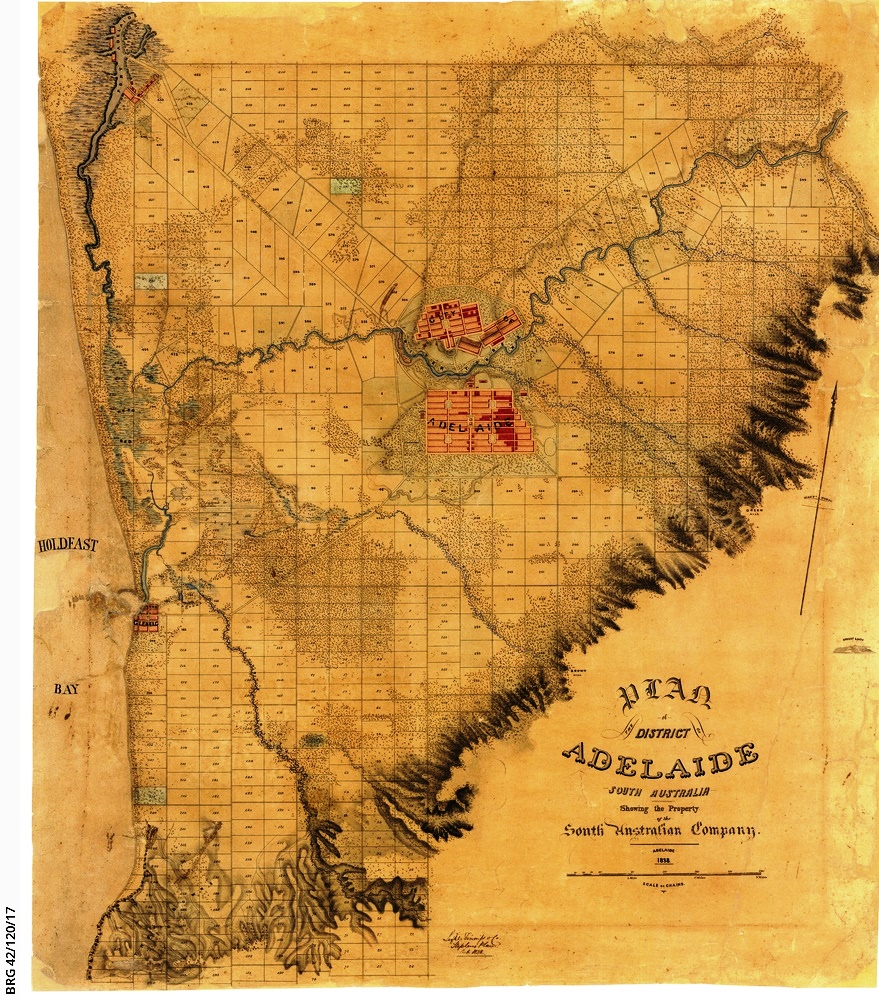
Cadastral map of the "District of Adelaide" based on Light's plan, showing the South Australian Company's property, Oct 1838

When Light was designing Adelaide, his plans included surrounding the city with 2,332 acres (9.44 km^{2}) of park. Of these, he reserved 32 acres for one of the world's earliest public cemeteries, now called West Terrace Cemetery.

Light referred to his unique figure-eight of open space as "Adelaide Park". Later, the purchase of the lands of Light's Adelaide Park, and repeated correspondence and discussions about the Adelaide Park land/lands eventually corrupted his original name to "Adelaide Park Lands".

Light placed the city to the north and south of the river, avoiding areas prone to flooding and making best use of the local topography. His survey plan divided the land into 1042 square one-acre lots; 342 acres (1.38 km^{2}) north of the Torrens (North Adelaide) and 700 acres (2.8 km^{2}) to the south (South Adelaide, now known as the city centre). Light's Plan reserved 42 acres (0.17 km^{2}) for town squares (38 acres) and government buildings (4 Town Sections of Public Reserves with Victoria Square frontages: now the Old Treasury Building/Lands Offices; GPO; Supreme Court, and Magistrates Court sites).
In March 1837, after 116 preliminary buyers had selected their portions, the rest of the Town Sections were auctioned. Due to local demands Light also planned Town Sections at the old Port Adelaide harbour and 29 were selected.

Adelaide's characteristic geometrical grid pattern is not unprecedented: apart from earlier examples going back to ancient Greece, it follows part of a series of rules created by Spanish planners for their colonial cities, known as the "Laws of the Indies". They included the grid pattern with a main thoroughfare, centred around a main square. There are many historical precedents for five squares, including Philadelphia in America, designed in 1682 by surveyor Thomas Holme, however Light's Plan has six public squares. There are however no records showing that Light deliberately copied any cities or rules for planning, and his implementation of planning principles for a beautiful and healthy city, melded sensitively and intelligently with the landscape, is unique.

"Light's vision" was to create an urban form which complemented nature, done with conscious purpose. Long before Light was engaged, the colonisation of South Australia had been designed as a kind of social experiment, drawing on the thinking of many notable minds: Jeremy Bentham, George Grote, Robert Owen, John Stuart Mill, and, closest to home, Edward Gibbon Wakefield. Cities such as the ancient Greek city-states, those in Spain’s colonies of the New World and British Canada, Pennsylvania and other American cities, New South Wales, Van Diemen’s Land and Swan River Colony had been carried out. His plan bears a close resemblance to Gother Mann’s 1788 "Plan for Torento Harbour" (which was never laid out as planned, on the north shore of Lake Ontario, although a differently laid out town, named York, was established to its west, which later eventually expanded east and north covering the unrealised 'Torento' model township site, and renamed Toronto, Canada), particularly in the square "Town Acres".

The oldest known version of Light's plan was drawn by a 16-year-old draughtsman in 1837, to instructions from Light, some time after the streets were named on 23 May of that year. Primary source researcher Kelly Henderson has confirmed that there is an extant original 1838 cadastral map of Adelaide, held by the State Library of South Australia. It was commissioned from Light, Finniss & Co. by the South Australian Company, shows the company's properties, and is signed with his firm's name by William Light, at the firm's office in Stephens Place, [Adelaide] in Oct 1838.

== After resignation ==
By this time Light had spent a considerable amount of his own fortune on his work, and was suffering ill-health. He resigned from his position on 21 June 1838, after being directed to survey 150 mi^{2} (390 km^{2}) within a week and refusing to use less accurate surveying methods for country surveys. In July 1838, he formed a private company, Light, Finniss & Co., with assistant surveyors B. T. Finniss (arr. Cygnet), Henry Nixon (arr. Navarino) and William Jacob (among those who came out on the Rapid), and draughtsman Robert G. Thomas (being among those who came out on the Cygnet), offering a range of services to prospective purchasers of city and country properties, and to local government bodies. By agreement with the new Governor George Gawler, Light surveyed the Port River, and, for William Finke, the town of Glenelg. However Light had to resign due to ill health by September, after Finniss had taken up a new appointment under Gawler as Deputy Surveyor-General.

His war wounds troubled him, and he suffered from tuberculosis, but he gained enjoyment from cultivating good crops of vegetables in his garden.

On 22 January 1839 the Land and Survey Office, along with the adjoining huts belonging to Light and Resident Commissioner James Hurtle Fisher, and the first Government House, burned down, taking some of the province's early records and many of Light's possessions with it. The fire was attributed to arson. He had just begun work on preparing his journals, kept for 30 years, for publication, having left cases of papers for safety in the survey office, and apart from an excerpt already prepared, the journals were lost – a great blow to Light.

== Other activities and personal life ==
Light spoke several languages and was a gifted and prolific painter and sketcher. Many of his watercolours were published in London in 1823 and 1828, and a number of his works, including an incomplete self-portrait in oils, are in the collection of Art Gallery of South Australia on North Terrace. Others are housed in the State Library of South Australia and in the Adelaide Town Hall. He often sold his works to support himself, but many were lost when fire destroyed the Land and Survey Office and his adjacent hut in January 1839.

In December 1837 Light led an exploration from Adelaide, discovering and naming the Barossa Range, after which the Barossa Valley was named.

=== Maria Gandy ===
Maria (pronounced "Mariah") Gandy (23 November 1811 – 14 December 1847) was designated by Light's Will as his housekeeper, but thought to be his de facto wife. The status of their relationship caused the couple to be shunned by Adelaide society, and they had few visitors at their home (only two society women ever visited Gandy at her home), which they shared with Gandy's young brothers for some years.

They first lived aboard the survey brig Rapid, then in a tent at Rapid Bay, and then in a house made of bark and reeds, which was completely destroyed by fire, along with all of their personal belongings, in 1839. The four-roomed brick built cottage, built by William Gandy, was named Theberton House, after Light's childhood residence at Theberton Hall in Suffolk.

Another brother, George Gandy, who arrived in 1838, named his child William Light Gandy in 1840.

On 7 July 1840, nine months after Light's death, Maria Gandy married Dr George Mayo, with whom she had 4 children. They lived in the Thebarton cottage for a while, before moving to Carrington Street. In 1847, aged 36, Maria Mayo died of tuberculosis, not long after the death of their fourth child, and was buried in an unmarked grave in West Terrace Cemetery. The 100 acres of Section 1 and the four Town Acres bequeathed to her were intact, and their rents and profits were accorded to her husband.

On the 200th anniversary of her birth on 23 November 2011, the Maria Gandy Bicentennial Memorial was unveiled on the corner of Albert and Maria Streets in the inner western suburb of Thebarton (so named because of a typographical error) near the site of their cottage, to honour Maria. On each of four sides is an inscription celebrating her roles as pioneer, settler, carer and mother.

Some strange drawings and diagrams discovered in the Flinders University library collections of Mayo and Dutton papers suggested that Gandy "moved around the state with an entourage of dwarfs".

Today, historians view Gandy as providing strength to the sickly Light, helping him to achieve his goals while being treated as a pariah by many fellow pioneers.

== Later life, death and burial ==
Gandy nursed Light for three years while he was invalided by tuberculosis, until his death on 6 October 1839 in Adelaide, aged 53. Reverend Charles Beaumont Howard, the only Anglican clergyman in South Australia at the time, had refused to visit him because of his relationship with Gandy.

On 10 October 1839, after a group of mourners met at his home, his funeral service took place at Trinity Church on North Terrace, after which the procession walked to the nearby Light Square. It was attended by hundreds, many of whom wept openly, and a gun salute was fired and the flag at Government House lowered to half-mast.

Gandy was executrix and sole beneficiary of Light's estate (which consisted mainly of unpaid debts) and paid for the funeral. The funeral took place on 10 October, and his body taken for burial at Light Square. More than 3,000 people attended the burial, including many who had been antagonistic towards him. The sole remaining document authored by Light was his will.

A few days later a meeting of his friends, chaired by John Morphett, assembled to raise money for a memorial. The foundation stone for the memorial was laid by James Hurtle Fisher in 1843, and witnessed by a select few, but the edifice itself, designed by George Strickland Kingston free of charge, was not completed until February 1845. It was a pentagonal elaborate structure, built of freestone and topped with what was described by Francis Dutton as a Gothic cross 45 ft (14 m) high. (Note: Described in some detail in a footnote in Steuart's book, quoting Dutton, and see also Legacy, etc. section below. The cross looks similar to a Celtic cross.)

== Legacy, recognition, memorials ==
Light's plan for the city of Adelaide has been recognized in multiple memorials.

=== Light's Vision ===
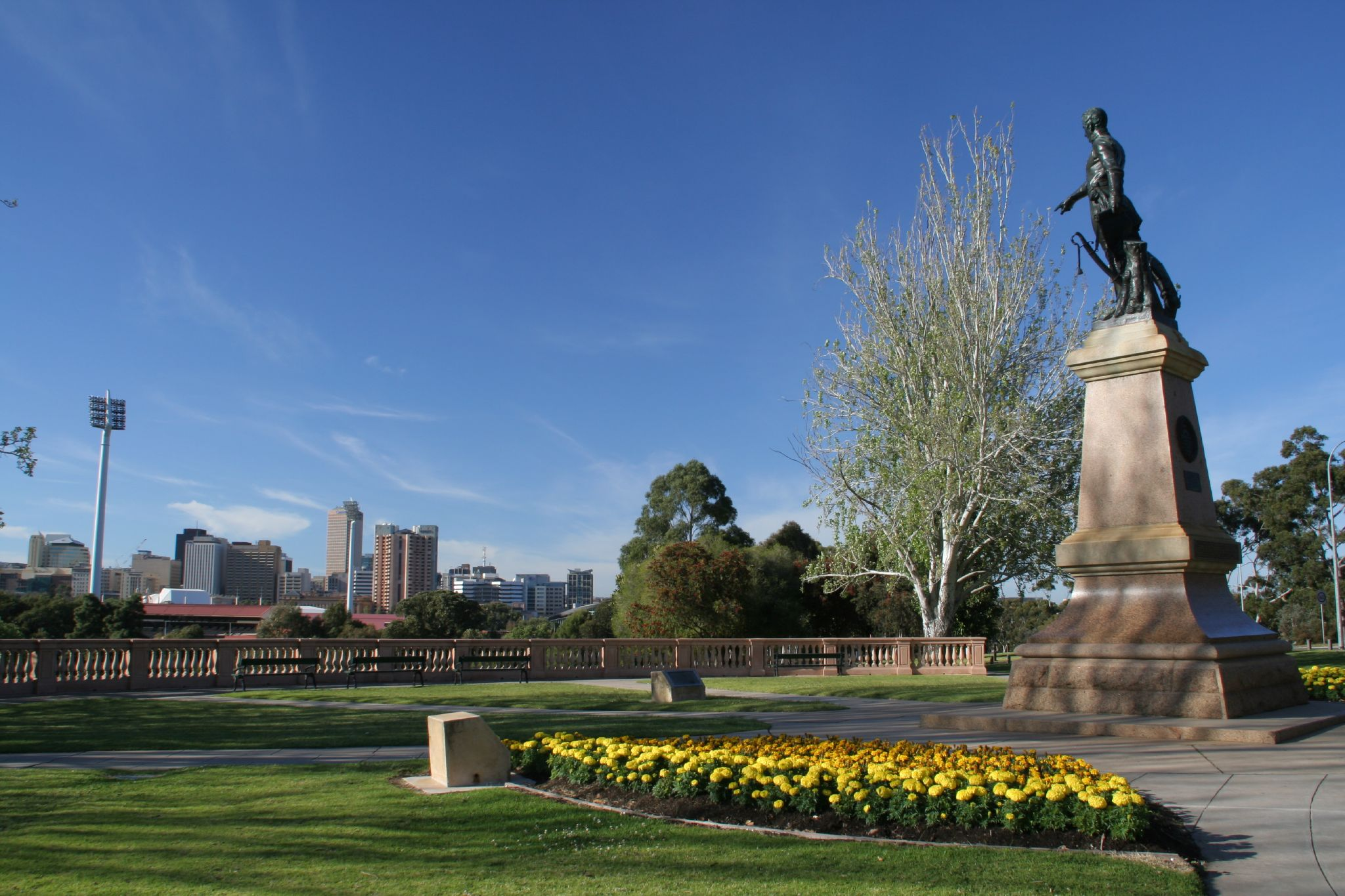
Light's Vision at Montefiore Hill in North Adelaide

The most well-known memorial of Light is the statue now on Montefiore Hill and known as Light's Vision, which points southwards towards the River Torrens and the city centre.

Edinburgh sculptor William Birnie Rhind's design for the statue was selected by committee on 23 December 1904, and architects Garlick, Sibley and Wooldridge (consisting of only Henry Evan Sibley (1867–1917) and Charles W. Wooldridge at that point (Note: The firm also designed the pedestal for the Boer War Memorial at the corner of North Terrace and King William Street, Unley Town Hall, some of the Hackney tram barn buildings, the Scarfe Cottage Homes in Gertrude St, Norwood and many smaller projects.)) designed the pedestal. The statue of Light was unveiled on 27 November 1906 in its original location at the northern end of Victoria Square, (opposite the General Post Office). The ceremony was presided over by the Mayor of Adelaide, Theodore Bruce, attended by many notables, including the Chief Justice, John Hannah Gordon, and the Premier, Thomas Price. The Governor of South Australia, Sir George Le Hunte, gave an address in which he praised Light highly, cheered on by the crowd.

The statue was moved in 1938 to its present position on Montefiore Hill at the suggestion of the Pioneers' Association of South Australia, to commemorate the centenary of Light's death, and the renamed "Light`s Vision" at the suggestion of PASA president Sir Henry Newland. Legend says that Light stood on Montefiore Hill when he began planning the city, but this is not confirmed.

The inscription on the plaque at the front reads: Colonel William Light First Surveyor General; Fixed the site and laid out the city of Adelaide in 1836; Erected by citizens; 1906. Several plaques have been added to the back.

=== Other symbols of recognition ===
Light's achievements have been commemorated in a number of ways, including:

- Light Square, Adelaide, where he was buried. He remains the only person legally buried within the Adelaide "square mile". (Note: Adelaide's West Terrace Cemetery is on the west side of West Terrace, and hence is not within "the square mile".)

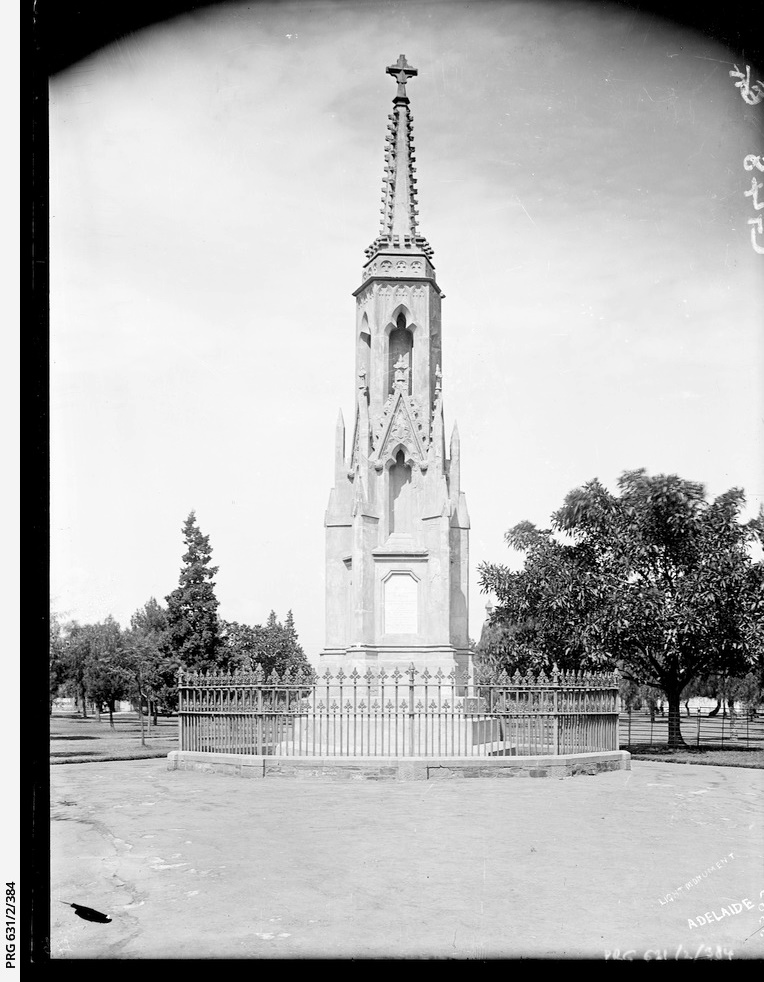
Original Light Memorial at Light Square

- His grave monument, the original version having been designed by Kingston as the result of a competition, a pentagonal structure made of sandstone and topped with a Gothic cross carved by Samuel Lewis (Note: Lewis also did the stonework for a windmill designed by Strickland, built in 1842.) and completed in 1844. In 1876 the Adelaide City Council placed a white marble tablet on a panel of the monument, with an inscription acknowledging the pioneers of South Australia for erecting the memorial.
  - The sandstone weathered badly, and the memorial was replaced by the winning design in a competition, by architect Herbert Louis Jackman. (Note: Jackman worked with Daniel Garlick, and later with his brother Sydney on the Adelaide railway station.) It featured a bronze tripod and theodolite on a tall column made of red granite sourced from the Murray Bridge area, with a base of Monarto grey granite, and was unveiled in June 1905 by mayor of Adelaide Theodore Bruce after an address by Deputy Governor Sir Samuel Way. It notes that Light is the only person legally buried after settlement within the city square. The 1876 marble tablet was removed, renovated and mounted on slate, and afterwards in the vestibule of the State Library. The gravesite and monument were upgraded during 1985–86 and again in 2008.
  - In 2019, an Adelaide conservationist proposed the rebuilding of the original monument on North Terrace, dedicating it to the Kaurna people, the Old Colonists of the South Australian Association, and the early settlers, in time for the 200th anniversary of the founding of Adelaide (2036).
- Light Passage, located in the Port River between Pelican Point and Torrens Island.
- The Colonel Light Hotel. (Light Square, corner Currie Street) Established in 1849 as the Sir Robert Peel Hotel, in 1888 it was renamed the Colonel Light Hotel.
- The Light River, which has its source at Waterloo, and runs 164 km (102 mi) to its mouth in the Gulf St Vincent.
- The County of Light was named after the Light River in 1842.
- In 1905, after the unveiling of the new grave monument, Light’s self-portrait in oils was presented to the Art Gallery by George Gibbes Mayo, son of George Mayo, who had died in 1894. He gifted the painting on condition that the State Government contribute £1,000 towards the replacement grave monument to the Light.
- The naming of the garden suburb of Colonel Light Gardens in the 1920s.
- The Adelaide suburb of Lightsview gazetted in 2016, which includes street names with a personal connection to Light's life, such as Gandy Lane, Penang Avenue, Rapid Avenue and Francis Street.
- Light Memorial at Rapid Bay – a cairn commemorating Light's landing at Rapid Bay, where he performed his first mainland survey in 1836, unveiled in 1928.
- A memorial known as the Colonel Light Survey Marker, in the form of an obelisk and plaque, was created for placement near the corner of North and West Terraces, marking the approximate location of the Land and Survey offices and of Light's and Fisher's huts, which were destroyed by fire in January 1839. The memorial was unveiled on 16 July 1929 by Lord Mayor John Lavington Bonython, but went into storage in 2011, before being re-situated outside the main entrance of the new Royal Adelaide Hospital.
- Located at the northern end of the Victoria Square, the State Survey Mark commemorates the placing of the first peg for the survey of the city by Light on 11 January 1837. This survey mark is the reference point for all other survey marks in South Australia. The mark was unveiled, along with a commemorative plaque by then Minister of Lands, Susan Lenehan on 21 April 1989.
- Theberton House was demolished to make way for a factory/warehouse in 1926 by Colton, Palmer and Preston Ltd. A plaque to commemorate Light's cottage was unveiled nearby in 1927. The site was taken over by the South Australian Brewing Company and the plaque was situated inside the old West End Brewery building. In 1995, a second plaque was erected by the Royal Geographical Society of South Australia in the brewery carpark, in Hindmarsh.
- Light Square in the Adelaide suburb of Marion (cnr. Nixon and Market Streets). Four cairns commemorate the early history of the area and original survey of the village by Light, Finniss and Co. in 1838.
- William Light School, a state government school located in the Adelaide suburb of Plympton. In 2017 it was renamed Plympton International College.
- A plaque on the Jubilee 150 Walkway, located along North Terrace in 1986, commemorates William Light.
- Each April the Adelaide City Council celebrates Light’s birthday, a tradition which began in 1859 when four of the colony's founders and friends of Light, George Palmer, Jacob Barrow Montefiore, (Note: More work needs to be done on this person, but it seems likely that this is him.) Raikes Currie and Alexander Lang Elder, presented a large ornamental silver bowl known as the "Loving Cup", made in England in 1766–77, to the mayor and council, with the request that a toast be made to Light each year on his birthday. A portrait of Light created in 1836 was presented by an admirer to hang in the Council Chamber.
- Twelve paintings by Light, including two self portraits, are in the collection of the Art Gallery of South Australia. A portrait of Light by George Jones RA from about 1815 also hangs in the National Portrait Gallery, London in London.

His life was dramatised in the Max Afford stage play Awake My Love, which was based on an earlier play of Afford's, Colonel Light - The Founder.

=== New 1837 watercolour discovered 2019 ===
A watercolour painted by Light between January and April 1837 depicting the site of the Land/Survey Office and Light and Fisher's huts, being a variation on Light's "Commencement of Settlement in South Australia, 1837", with Mount Lofty in the background, was discovered in a garage in September 2019. It is regarded as hugely significant, being one of the earliest depictions of Adelaide. However, the painting passed in at auction and was afterwards sold to a private collector for A$20,000, despite being valued at between A$90,000 and A$120,000 and being hailed by fine arts dealer Jim Elder as a "rare and historic painting", who was "bitterly disappointed" that it would be lost to South Australian society. He said that "months of painstaking art history and genealogical research" into its provenance had led to a man called Shimmin, who had worked for Light’s colleague William Jacob in the Barossa Valley and in whose family it had remained for generations. In the week before the auction, a television station had aired an "item from an interstate amateur art historian debunking the provenance of [the] work".

== In the arts ==
=== Stage ===
In October 2019, co-commissioned by Adelaide's OzAsia festival and Penang's George Town Festival, a play was created and staged by Australian writer and director Thomas Henning in collaboration with Malaysian duo TerryandTheCuz, named Light. The play explores the personal circumstances first of Francis Light and his pivotal role in Penang's modern history, and then of his son William in Adelaide. The play aimed to use Light's inner perspective to look at the world, and touches on "the values and notions of nationalism".

=== Novel ===
A novel by Adelaide writer Lyn Dickens, titled Salt Upon the Water, explores Light's Asian heritage. It won the Wakefield Press Unpublished Manuscript Award at the 2024 South Australian Literary Awards, and in May 2026 it was longlisted for the Miles Franklin Award.

== Misconceptions ==
=== Port Adelaide ===
The 29 Town Sections which Light allotted for the harbour area of Port Adelaide have been all but forgotten as part of his plan, which is often mistakenly thought to include only the city centre, with the North Adelaide part tacked on afterwards.

=== Christchurch, NZ ===
It is sometimes claimed that Light also designed the city centre of Christchurch in New Zealand. However, this is not possible; Light died in Adelaide in 1839, whereas Christchurch was only laid out by Englishman Edward Jollie in March 1850. The shared principles of the town planning of Adelaide, South Australia, and Christchurch, New Zealand, were due to both being examples of E. G. Wakefield's 'Art of Colonization' and Benthamite town planning.

== See also ==
- British colonisation of South Australia
- History of Adelaide
- History of South Australia
