= Robert George Thomas =

Australian architect and draughtsman (1820–1883)

Robert George Thomas FRIBA
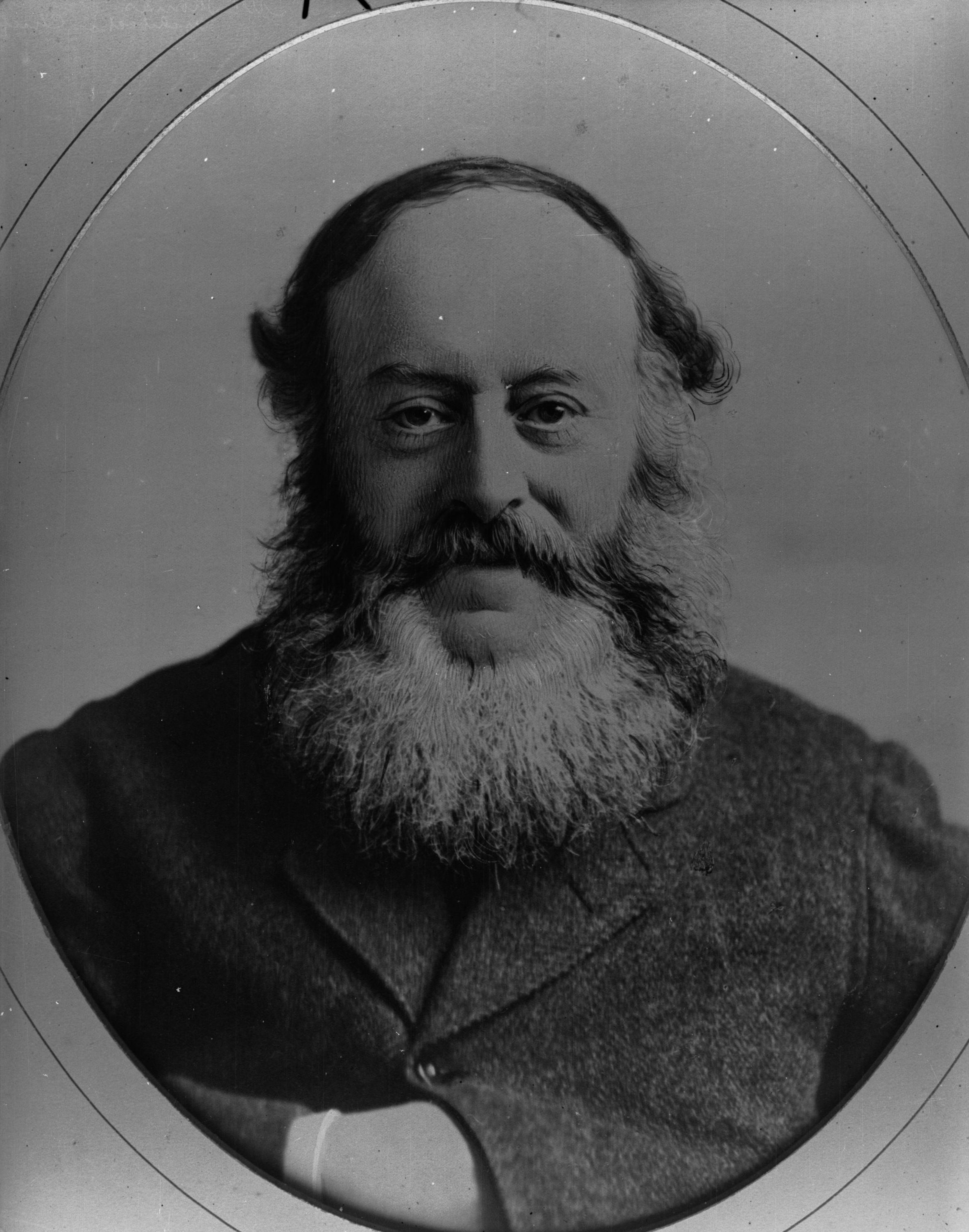
- Thomas in 1910
- Born: 16 February 1820
- Died: 14 April 1883 (aged 63)
- Occupations: Architect; draughtsman
- Spouse: Charlotte Tuckett (m. 1856)
- Parent(s): Robert Thomas (father); Mary Thomas (mother)
- Practice: James & Thomas
- Buildings: Flinders Street Baptist Church; Stow Memorial Congregational Church; Parkside Lunatic Asylum; Port Adelaide Institute

Robert George Thomas (16 February 1820 – 14 April 1883) was a draftsman and architect in the British colony of South Australia. He copied Surveyor-General Colonel William Light's original plan for the City of Adelaide and was later responsible for the design and execution of some of its significant buildings, including several churches in a Gothic style.

== Biography ==
Thomas was the eldest son of newspaperman Robert Thomas, and was articled as a draftsman to George Strickland Kingston, who was appointed by the Colonization Commissioners for South Australia to accompany Colonel William Light to South Australia. Light's brief was to select and survey a site for the city of Adelaide, and survey it ready for sale to speculators and prospective residents. They were part of the "First Fleet of South Australia" of 1836: Light was on the Rapid, but Thomas was with Kingston, aboard Cygnet, which arrived in South Australia a month after Rapid, much to Light's annoyance. The sixteen-year-old Thomas was confusingly also listed as a passenger on the Rapid. His parents and brother William Kyffin Thomas were also in the "First Fleet" aboard Africaine, to set up the colony's first newspaper, the South Australian Register, and print the Government Gazette.

It was Thomas, a "very clever penman" who copied Light's original map of [South] Adelaide and North Adelaide. Light left the employ of the Colonization Commissioners for South Australia in 1838 and founded a private firm, Light, Finniss & Co., with Thomas as a junior partner, to act as surveyors and land agents and to provide expert assistance to prospective landowners, and to Local Government bodies. The company was dissolved prior to the death of Light in October 1839. Thomas then worked as secretary for Kingston, who succeeded Light as Superintendent of Surveys (but was never appointed as Surveyor-General), at the same time working as architect on the original Adelaide Hospital. Although he had no formal training as an architect, he demonstrated considerable aptitude and gained experience in 1845 designing business premises, then in April 1846, he left with fellow architect W. P. James aboard the Cleveland for Britain, where the recent boom in railway construction had put a premium on experienced architects. James and Thomas had worked together on the design of a bridge for the River Torrens, whose failure was blamed on their design, and the resulting controversy may have precipitated their departure. However Samuel Lewis stated that he had not used anyone else's design.

Thomas worked as surveyor and architect in Newport, Monmouthshire; he designed the Gothic entrance to the Cardiff Cemetery, and its Mortuary Chapels, and a Masonic Hall for the use of the Silurian Lodge No. 691. He married Charlotte Tuckett in 1856, and they had several children while still in Britain.

They returned to Adelaide aboard the Eizabeth Ann in June 1861, after a rather long passage of 101 days, towards the end of which Mrs. Thomas gave birth to a boy. During his absence from the colony he had qualified as Associate of the Royal Institute of British Architects, and lost no time in establishing a practice on King William Street at the Gresham Street corner. Thomas's first big contract was for design and oversight of the new Flinders Street Baptist Church, where the first service was held in April 1863. He designed another Baptist chapel, completed the following year, in Alberton. His next major project was the Stow Memorial Church (now Pilgrim Uniting Church), where the first services were held in April 1867.

Thomas was appointed Assistant Government Architect in June 1866 as deputy to the Government Engineer William Hanson. Shortly afterwards, the department was reorganised and he was designated Government Architect at a salary of £600 per annum. His achievements during this time include the Supreme Court building in Adelaide; the Magill Orphanage at Magill; Mount Gambier Hospital, the Sailors' Home at Port Adelaide, and the Parkside Lunatic Asylum at Glenside. He oversaw construction of the General Post Office, designed by Wright, Woods & Hamilton. Thomas was obliged, as a cost saving measure, to redesign the tower at a reduced height. His position was abolished in September 1870 and Thomas returned to private practice.

His original design for the State Library of South Australia was amended by later colonial architect E. J. Woods, whose designs for what is now the Mortlock Chamber was built between 1879 and 1884.

He resumed private practice in 1870, but the only substantial buildings for which he was responsible in this period were St. Augustine's (Anglican) church in Unley, which he designed in 1864, and the Port Adelaide Institute on Commercial Road, Port Adelaide in 1875.

Lack of finance meant the foundation stone for St. Augustine's was not laid until August 1869, and its supervising architect was the Hon. Thomas English MLC. Thomas served as Secretary to the Central Board of Health from 1874 and died at home in Unley after a protracted illness.

== Other interests ==
He was a fine amateur artist, with watercolors his specialty.

== Recognition ==
- He was elected a Fellow of the Royal Institution of British Architects in December 1866.

== Family ==
Thomas married Charlotte Annette Shum Tuckett (c. 1831 – 11 Jul 1910) in Britain on 16 September 1856. Their children included:

- Robert George Shum Thomas (31 July 1857 – )
- Mary Anette Thomas (2 June 1859 – )
- Kyffin Michael Shum Thomas (8 May 1861 – 13 January 1862) born at sea aboard Elizabeth Ann en route to South Australia
- Clara Eliza Thomas (2 May 1864 – 27 Oct 1885)
- Llewellyn Shum Thomas (17 August 1865 – 21 July 1890)
- Ernest Alfred Shum Thomas (6 August 1867 – )
- Arthur Churchill Thomas (4 May 1869 – 28 April 1934)
- Laura Henrietta Thomas (10 July 1871 – 12 May 1929)

They had a home on 2.5 acres (1.0 ha) in Mary Street, Unley.

== Gallery ==
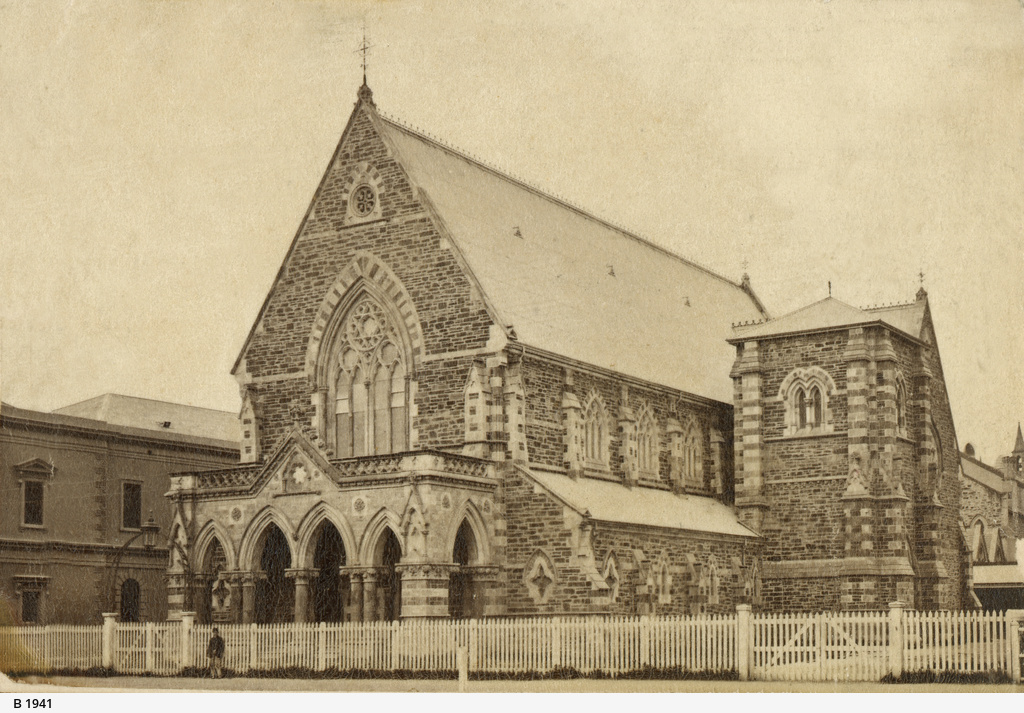
Stow Memorial Church

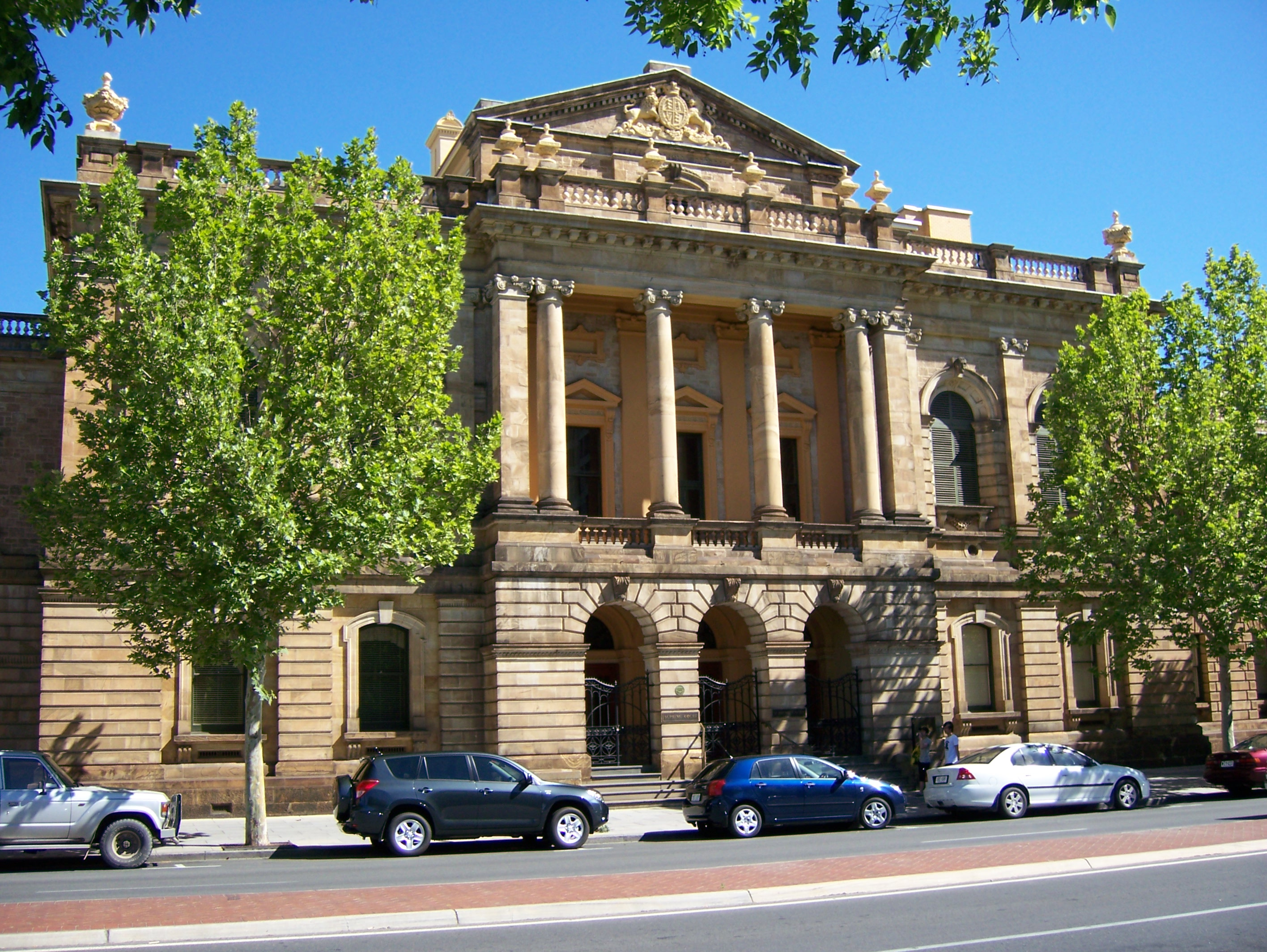
Supreme Court building

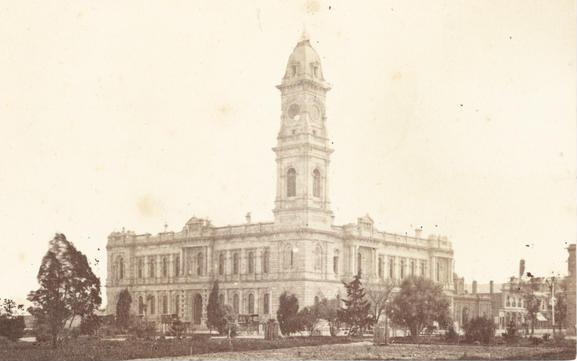
Adelaide GPO

== Sources ==
- Architects of South Australia: Robert George Thomas
