= John Michael Skipper =

English and South Australian artist and solicitor

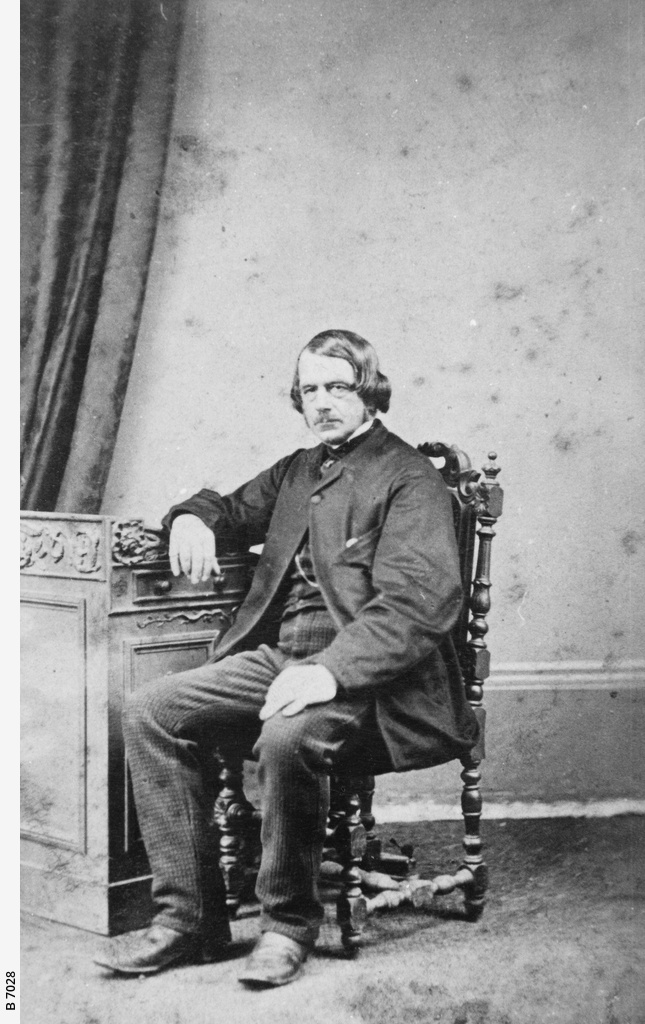
- Skipper in 1963
- Born: 12 July 1815; Norwich, Norfolk, England
- Died: 7 December 1883 (aged 68); Kent Town, South Australia
- Occupation(s): Solicitor and artist
- Spouses: Frances Amelia Thomas (m. 1839; died 1855) Mary Thomas (m. 1856; died 1883)
- Children: 7

John Michael Skipper (1815–1883) was an English and South Australian artist and solicitor. He was the eldest son of solicitor John Skipper and Jane (née Stark), whose brother was artist James Stark.

== Early life ==
Skipper studied at Norwich Grammar School and was intended to follow his father into law, but his interest in art was encouraged by his uncle. In 1833, he left his study to become a midshipman on the Sherbourne for the East India Company. When he returned, he arranged to be articled to Charles Mann (appointed as the first Advocate-General of South Australia) and emigrate to the new Colony of South Australia on the Africaine arriving at Holdfast Bay on 6 November 1836. He travelled in intermediate class, but was reported to have taken his meals in the 1st cabin.

== Career ==
In South Australia, Skipper was associated with his mentor Charles Mann and lawyer Edward Castres Gwynne. He was admitted to the bar of the Supreme Court of South Australia in 1840.

In 1851, Skipper joined many others in the Victorian gold rush. A year later he returned to South Australia with many sketches, but not gold. He moved to Port Adelaide as Clerk of the Court and remained there until his retirement in 1872.

As an artist, Skipper depicted nature, social events, and everyday life. His work has become a valuable record of life in the early stages of the colony.

== Personal life ==
Skipper married Frances Amelia Thomas in Adelaide on 28 December 1839. He had met her on the journey from England. Her parents were Robert and Mary Thomas who had also been on the same ship. Frances died on 27 February 1855 (aged 36) leaving five children. Skipper married Frances' younger sister Mary on 28 April 1856 and had two more children with her. Mary died on 28 April 1883 aged 59. Skipper died on 7 December 1883, aged 66, without a will despite having worked in law most of his life.
