= Proclamation Day =

Public holiday in Australia

Proclamation Day commonly refers to the anniversary of the proclamation of government of the province of South Australia, which continues to be celebrated in South Australia on 28 December, although no longer a public holiday. The anniversary of the establishment of self-government on 21 October 1890 was formerly known as Proclamation Day in Western Australia.

== South Australia ==
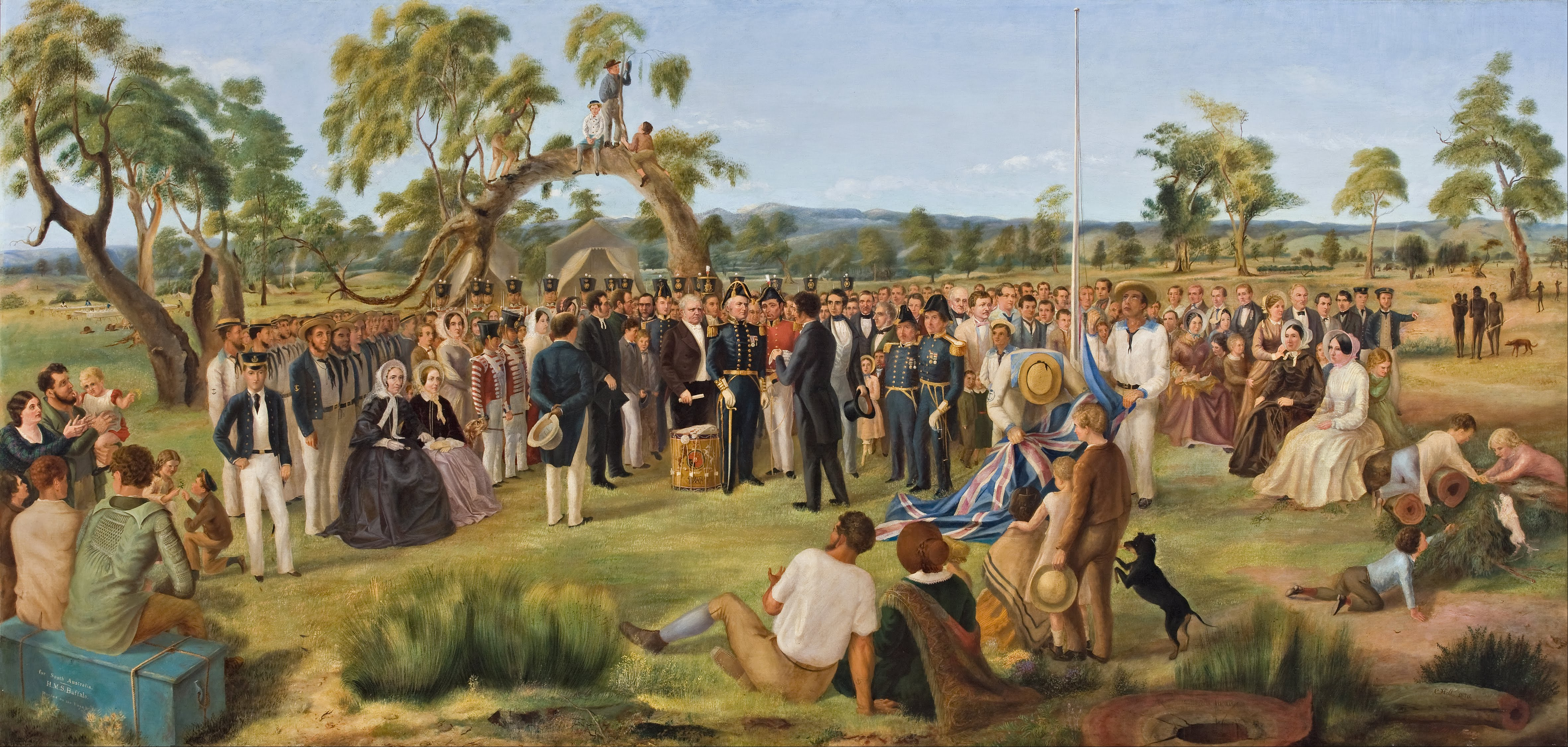
Charles Hill, The Proclamation of South Australia, 1836 (1856), Art Gallery of South Australia

=== Background ===
Proclamation Day in South Australia celebrates the establishment of government in the colony of South Australia as a British province. The province itself was officially created and proclaimed in 1834 when the British Parliament passed the South Australia Act 1834, which empowered King William IV to create South Australia as a British province and to provide for its colonisation and government. It was ratified on 19 February 1836, when King William issued Letters Patent establishing the province. The proclamation announcing the establishment of Government was made by Captain John Hindmarsh beside The Old Gum Tree at the present-day suburb of Glenelg North on 28 December 1836. The proclamation specified the same protection under the law for the local native population as for the settlers.

The proclamation was drafted aboard Buffalo by Hindmarsh's private secretary, George Stevenson, and printed by Robert Thomas (1782–1860), who came from England with his family on Africaine, arriving at Holdfast Bay on 8 November 1836. Thomas brought with him the first printing press to reach South Australia. The press was a Stanhope Invenit No. 200, and was on display in the State Library until 2001.

It was signed by the Colonial Secretary, Robert Gouger, who had also travelled on the Africaine.

The colonising fleet prior to Buffalo consisted of eight vessels which had first arrived at Nepean Bay on Kangaroo Island before being directed to Holdfast Bay on the mainland. The first vessel to arrive at Nepean Bay was Duke of York on 27 July 1836 which did not proceed to Holdfast Bay but instead set off on a whaling expedition. Africaine was the seventh to arrive at Nepean Bay (4 Nov 1836), discharging settlers at Holdfast Bay on 9 November 1836. Seven of these earlier ships preceded Governor John Hindmarsh on Buffalo to enable preparations in advance of his formal arrival on 28 December. Thomas's wife Mary (1787–1875) published The Diary of Mary Thomas, in which she described the journey on Africaine and the early years in South Australia. An extract from the diary reads: "About December 20th 1836, we built a rush hut a short distance from our tents for the better accommodation of part of our family... and in this place (about 12 feet square) the first printing in South Australia was produced".

==== Text of the Proclamation ====
By His Excellency John Hindmarsh, Knight of the Royal Hanoverian Guelphic Order, Governor and Commander-in-Chief of His Majesty’s Province of South Australia.

In announcing to the Colonists of His Majesty’s Province of South Australia, the establishment of the Government, I hereby call upon them to conduct themselves on all occasions with order and quietness, duly to respect the laws, and by a course of industry and sobriety, by the practice of sound morality and a strict observance of the Ordinances of Religion, to prove themselves worthy to be the Founders of a great and free Colony.

It is also, at this time especially, my duty to apprize the Colonists of my resolution, to take every lawful means for extending the same protection to the Native Population as to the rest of His Majesty’s Subjects and of my firm determination to punish with exemplary severity, all acts of violence or injustice which may in any manner be practiced or attempted against the Natives who are to be considered as much under the Safeguard of the law as the Colonists themselves, and equally entitled to the privileges of British Subjects. I trust therefore, with confidence to the exercise of moderation and forbearance by all Classes, in their intercourse with the Native Inhabitants, and that they will omit no opportunity of assisting me to fulfil His Majesty’s most gracious and benevolent intentions toward them, by promoting their advancement in civilization, and ultimately, under the blessing of Divine Providence, their conversion to the Christian Faith.

By His Excellency’s Command,
Robert Gouger,
Colonial Secretary.
Glenelg, 28th December 1836.

God Save the King.

=== Status as a holiday ===
In 1876 Parliament decreed that the Proclamation Day holiday, a gala occasion when thousands descended on Glenelg, would henceforth be celebrated on 27 December in lieu of the 28th, in order to make a three-day Christmas holiday. Henry J. Moseley, proprietor of the Glenelg's Pier Hotel, was the first and loudest protester against the move, which was rescinded.

The Proclamation Day public holiday is prescribed in the South Australian Holidays Act, 1910. Originally the Act provided that the day was to be observed on 28 December, except when that day occurred on a Saturday or Sunday, at which times it was to be celebrated on the following Monday. On 4 November 1993, the Holidays Act 1910 was amended by the Holidays (Proclamation Day, Australia Day and Bank Holidays) Amendment Act 1993, changing the date for observance of the day to the day following the Christmas Day holiday, to coincide with Boxing Day as celebrated in other states. The change was made primarily as a response to the recommendations of the South Australian Industrial Relations Advisory Council, which had advised that the holiday should be changed to avoid stop/start work patterns, particularly in the retail industry. The change was also said to be consistent with national uniformity arrangements in relation to certain public holidays.

Formal ceremonies involving the most senior current officials and politicians, followed by public celebrations, continue to be held at the still-extant Old Gum Tree at Glenelg North on 28 December, or one day earlier on 27 December in some years. However, a small 2015 poll indicated that many South Australians did not know why Proclamation Day was commemorated, and it was not included in the school curriculum.

== Western Australia ==
Proclamation Day also refers to 21 October 1890, the day that Western Australia achieved self-government, with its own constitution and self-elected parliament. Proclamation Day was originally a public holiday, but its significance was overshadowed by the celebrations of the Eight Hours Day, which were held on the same day, and by 1919 the public holiday had been replaced by Labour Day.

Western Australia Day is celebrated on the first Monday in June each year to commemorate the founding of the Swan River Colony in 1829.

== See also ==
- Proclamation Day of the Republic of Latvia
