= Mary Thomas (poet) =

Australian poet (1787–1875)

Mary Thomas née Harris (30 August 1787 – 10 February 1875), commonly referred to as Mrs Mary Thomas, was a diarist, poet and early settler of South Australia. She married Robert Thomas on 8 January 1818 in Southampton. They had six children, one of whom died young.

She and four of their children accompanied her husband to South Australia on the Africaine and arrived at Holdfast Bay in November 1836. The eldest son (second child), Robert George Thomas, had travelled with George Strickland Kingston and reunited with the family when they arrived. The family wanted to "obtain a competence" in South Australia, but expected they "must go to England to enjoy it." He printed Governor John Hindmarsh's proclamation of the colony, which occurred under the Old Gum Tree on 28 December 1836.

Already a published poet at the time of her arrival in South Australia, she was a prolific letter writer and kept a diary which was first published in 1915 as The Diary and Letters of Mary Thomas. This gave a detailed account of her voyage on the Africaine as well as an insight into early colonial life.

She died at her house in Adelaide on 10 February 1875, leaving two sons and two daughters.

== Bibliography ==
- Thomas, Mary (1915), Thomas, Evan Kyffin (ed.), The diary and letters of Mary Thomas (1836-1866) : being a record of the early days of South Australia, W.K. Thomas & Co
