= George Mayo =

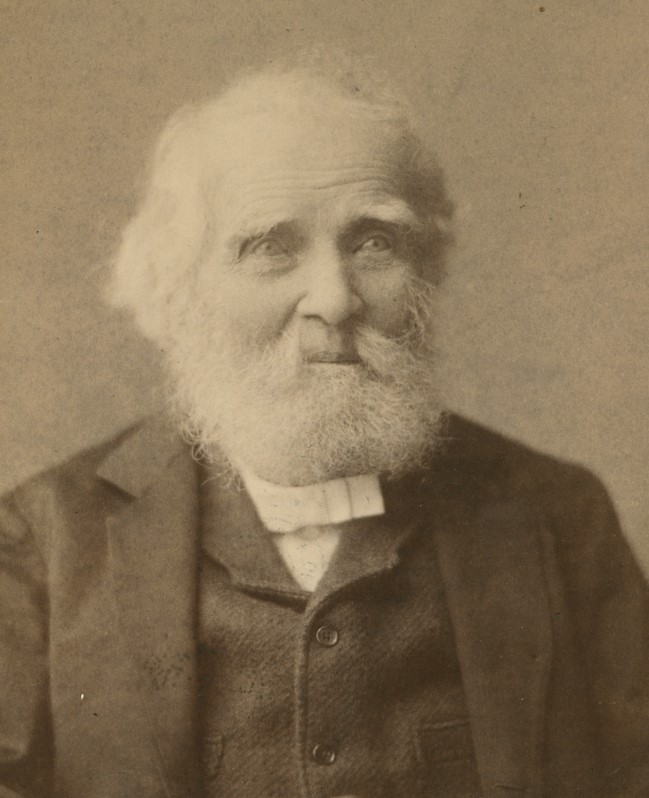
- Born: 8 January 1807; North Nibley, Gloucestershire, England
- Died: 16 December 1894 (aged 87); Adelaide, South Australia
- Occupations: surgeon, medical administrator
- Spouse(s): Maria Gandy (1811–1847) and Ellen Anne Russell (1817–1901)
- Parent: Rev. Joshua (or Joseph Mayo) M.A.

George Mayo (8 January 1807 – 16 December 1894) was a medical practitioner in the colony of South Australia.

Dr. Mayo was born in England the fourth son of Rev. Joseph Mayo, M.A., of Ozleworth Church, Gloucestershire. He studied medicine at Middlesex Hospital under Dr. Herbert Mayo (1796–1852), and became a member of the Royal College of Surgeons in London in January 1829. For some years he practised at Devizes, Wiltshire, then emigrated to South Australia, arriving in the Lady Emma in December 1837. Soon afterwards he returned to England, but came back to the colony on the Asia in July 1839. He returned again to England 1851–1852, when he was admitted as a Fellow of the R.C.S. He was appointed hon. medical officer at the Adelaide Hospital on 13 October 1853, and upon the death of Dr. R. W. Moore he became President of the Medical Board. He was appointed to the Central Vaccine Board in October 1857 and in January 1868 was appointed to the Adelaide Hospital board of management. On 24 November 1876, he was made Hon. Consulting Surgeon to the hospital.

He was an enthusiastic member of the South Australia's Voluntary Defence Force: in 1859 he was captain of the West Adelaide Rifles, and by August 1863 was lieutenant-colonel. He was one of the original trustees of Trinity Church, and laid the foundation stone of the schoolroom on 7 May 1887.

He was somewhat eccentric and extremely averse to publicity; his only photograph was as one in a group taken many years before his death. He was an enthusiast for physical exercise and a keen cyclist; in later life converting to a three-wheeler, in which he would regularly ride to Glenelg or North Adelaide. He was for some years a vice-president of several cycling clubs.

== Family ==
Mayo was a nephew of George Smith Gibbes, M.D., of Bath, Somerset.

He married Maria Gandy (23 November 1811 – 14 December 1847) on 7 July 1840. Maria had been William Light's housekeeper and common-law wife from the days of the brig Rapid or earlier, nursed him in his final days, and was the sole beneficiary of his will. The Mayos lived for a time at Light's "Thebarton Cottage".

On the 200th anniversary of Maria Gandy's birth on 23 November 2011, a rectangular memorial was unveiled on the corner of Albert and Maria Streets in the inner western suburb of Thebarton near the site of their cottage, to honour Maria. On each of four sides is an inscription celebrating her roles as pioneer, settler, carer and mother.

George and Maria's family included:

- Mary Jane Mayo (17 April 1841 – 22 June 1934) married Rev. Richardson Reid (1834 – 30 December 1898) on 4 January 1871. He was incumbent of Trinity Church, Adelaide
- Kate Mayo (1843 – 18 March 1834) married Dr. Alexander Stewart Paterson (c. 1835 – 6 January 1902) on 14 April 1868. Paterson was Colonial Surgeon, associated with W. L. Cleland.
- George Gibbes Mayo (1845 – 12 August 1921) was a member of John McKinlay's 1865 expedition to the Northern Territory, lived at Hill Street, North Adelaide. Among the possessions he inherited from his father was a priceless self-portrait in oils by Col. Light. This was gifted to the Art Gallery of South Australia in 1905 on condition that the State Government contribute £1,000 towards the replacement monument to the Colonel in Light Square.

He married Henrietta Mary Donaldson (1852–1930) in 1877. Among their children were:
- Dr. Helen Mary Mayo (1 October 1878 – 13 November 1967) women's health pioneer
- (George) Elton Mayo (26 December 1880 – 7 September 1949), noted psychologist
- Olive Mayo (1883–1896)
- Sir Herbert Mayo (1885–1972), noted jurist
- Mary Penelope Mayo (1889–1969)
- John Christian Mayo (1891–1955)

Their residence was on the north-eastern corner of Franklin and Morphett streets in the city. He married again in London, to Ellen Anne Russell (15 February 1817 – 21 July 1901) on 19 February 1852.

- Ellen Stuart Mayo (c. 1853 – 3 January 1946) married Arthur George de la Poer Beresford (c. 1853 – 27 March 1924), lived 217 Jeffcott Street, North Adelaide.
