= William George Field =

William George Field ( – 30 November 1850) also referred to as George Field, was a British naval officer, first mate of HMS Rapid and deputy to William Light, who was responsible for design and survey of the city of Adelaide, South Australia. He was commander of Rapid in another journey to Australia 26 February 1838 – 19 June 1838.

He has been credited with introducing orange trees into South Australia in 1837. Members of the Royal Geographical Society of Australasia made headlines when they discovered his headstone in the Willunga Cemetery in 1981. The Society has investigated the site and ruins of his homestead.

== Family ==
His brother, Henry Field, was an early pastoralist in the colonies of both South Australia and New South Wales. Henry's daughter, the writer K. Langloh Parker, was his niece.
