= Rapid (ship) =

History

United Kingdom of Great Britain and Ireland
- Name: Rapid
- Owner: 1826:Priest & Co.; 1826:Brest & Co.; 1830:J. Paynter & Co.; 1836:South Australian Company; 1840:A. Devlin
- Launched: 1821 or 1826, Yarmouth
- Fate: Wrecked 1841

General characteristics
- Tons burthen: 161, or 200, or 201 (bm)

Rapid was a brig launched in 1821 or 1826, at Yarmouth. In 1836, she brought William Light's surveying party to the new colony of South Australia. She was wrecked in 1841.

== History ==
Rapid was built in 1826, at Yarmouth, and featured a carved figurehead in the shape of a greyhound. She first appeared in Lloyd's Register (LR) in 1826, with William Joy, master, Priest & Co., owner, and trade Yarmouth–Hull. The next year her owner became Brest and her trade became Hull–St Petersburg.

Year	Master	Owner	Trade	Source
1830	J. Courtney	Paynter & Co.	Liverpool–Gibraltar	Lloyd's Register
1835	W. Phillips	J. Paynter & Co.	London–Malta	Lloyd's Register

== South Australia ==
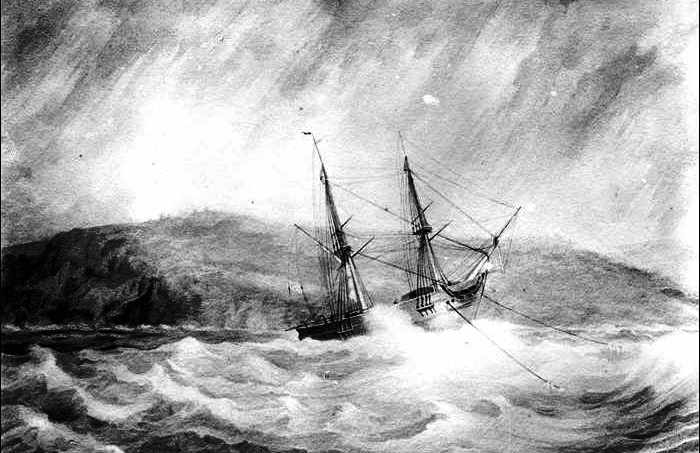
The Rapid near Rapid Bay (W. Light)

The board of commissioners of the South Australian Company purchased her to send out on their first fleet to establish the Colony of South Australia and the city of Adelaide. The company added a deck for passenger exercise, but as the height between decks was 4 ft 1 in (1.24 m), it was hardly luxurious. On 1 May 1836, Rapid left Blackwall, and sailed down the English Channel under the command of Col. William Light; she reached Kangaroo Island on 17 August 1836.

Light's crew included Lieut. W. G. Field, R.N. (first officer), Lieut. (later Admiral) William S. Pullen (second officer), Lieut. R. Hill (third officer) and John Woodforde (surgeon). Other members of the party were William Bell, W. Bradley, Robert Buck snr, Robert Buck jnr, William Chatfield, George Childs, William Claughton, John Duncan, William Freemantle, Maria Gandy, Light's common-law wife (referred to as his housekeeper), and her young brothers, Edward and William, Thomas Gepp, Robert Goddard, William Hodges, William Jacob, William Lawes, James Lewis, George Mildred, Hiram Mildred, George Penton, and Robert G. Thomas, John Thorn, John Thorpe, William Tuckey.

Rapid was used for survey work at Port Adelaide, and in 1837, sailed to England under Capt. William George Field with G. S. Kingston on board to report to the Colonisation Commissioners on the needs of the Survey Department. She returned to Adelaide in June 1838. She subsequently made several trips to Launceston, Van Diemen's Land. Lloyd's Register for 1841 (published in 1840), still carried her master as Light and her owner as the Australian Company.

== Fate ==
In 1840, Rapid was sold to Capt. Arthur Devlin. She was wrecked on a coral island near Rotuma early in the morning of 14 January 1841, while on a voyage from Port Jackson (Sydney), to China. All on board were rescued by Capt. Joseph Underwood of the whaling barque Avon, but not before their cargo and valuables had been appropriated by the island's traditional owners.

== Recognition ==
- Mr. Roper, harbormaster at Second Valley, found an anchor at Rapid Bay that was believed to be the one Rapid lost.
- The South Australian Maritime Museum holds an oil painting of Rapid by Doreen Bice (niece of J. G. Bice) after a watercolor sketch by Colonel Light.
- A number of Adelaide citizens claim descent from passengers on Rapid. Those listed in 1936 were: Mr. Alfred Barker, Mrs. Dean Berry, Mrs. Mary L. Brown, Mr. Malcolm Collins. Misses M. K. and R. Cussen, Mrs. F. Martin. Miss Florence Mildred, Mrs. L. Wray, Mrs. Percival Stow, Mrs. Annie Ross, Mrs. Willis, Dr. Helen Mayo, Miss Mayo, Mr. Hubert Mayo. K.C., Dr. John Mayo. Miss O'Halloran, Miss E. K. Barker. Miss Emily Penton, Mrs. F. M. Pratt, Mrs. M. Stenhouse, Mrs. F. J. Sweetapple and Mrs. H. W. Wunderley.
