= The Old Gum Tree =

Historic tree in Glenelg North, South Australia

Coordinates: 34°58′13.4″S 138°31′14.2″E

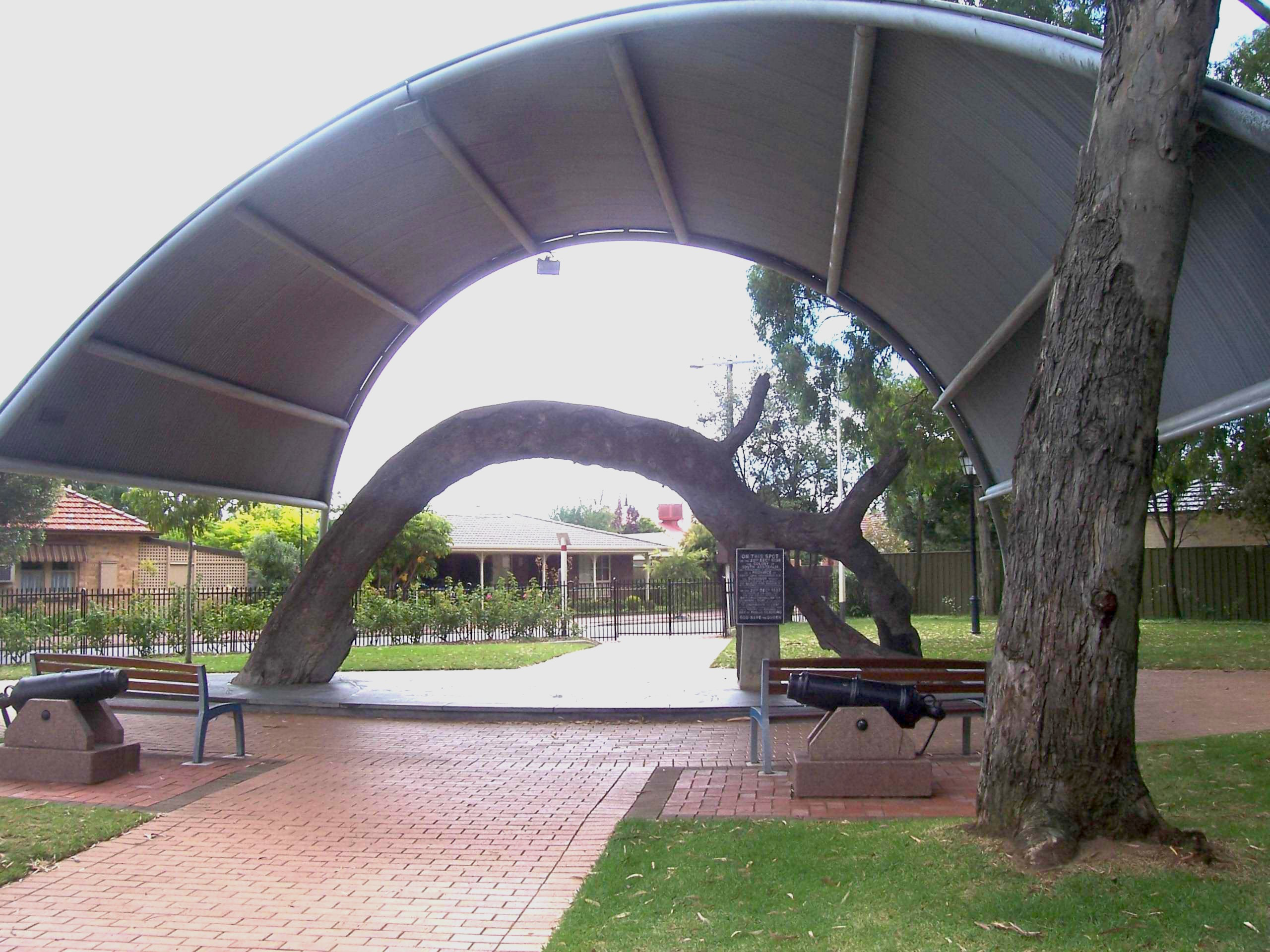
The Old Gum Tree

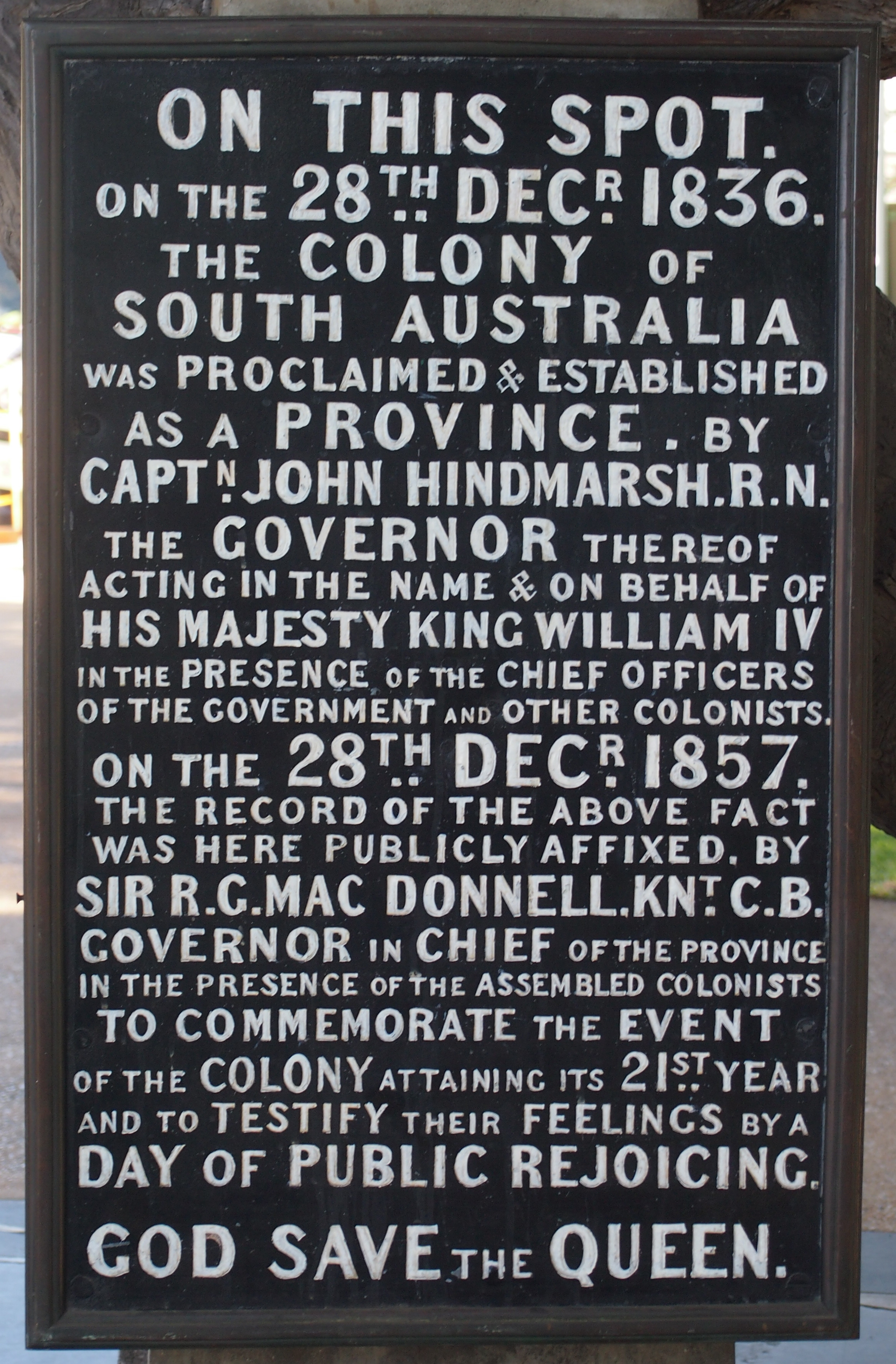
Plaque from 1857 celebrating the 21st anniversary of Proclamation Day at the site

The Old Gum Tree (also known as The Proclamation Tree) is a historic site in Glenelg North, South Australia. Near this tree on 28 December 1836, the British governor John Hindmarsh delivered the proclamation announcing the establishment of Government of the colony of South Australia. A ceremony is held each year at the site on Proclamation Day, with the current Governor reading out Hindmarsh's original speech. The site, known as Patha Yukuna in the Kaurna language, in 2025 featured Indigenous custodians holding an overnight camp and ceremonial fire preceding the official ceremony.

The tree itself, probably a red gum, was significant to the Kaurna people prior to colonisation, and had died by 1907. Its decayed outer surface was encased in concrete in 1963.

It was listed on the now-defunct Register of the National Estate in 1978 and listed on the South Australian Heritage Register in 1980.

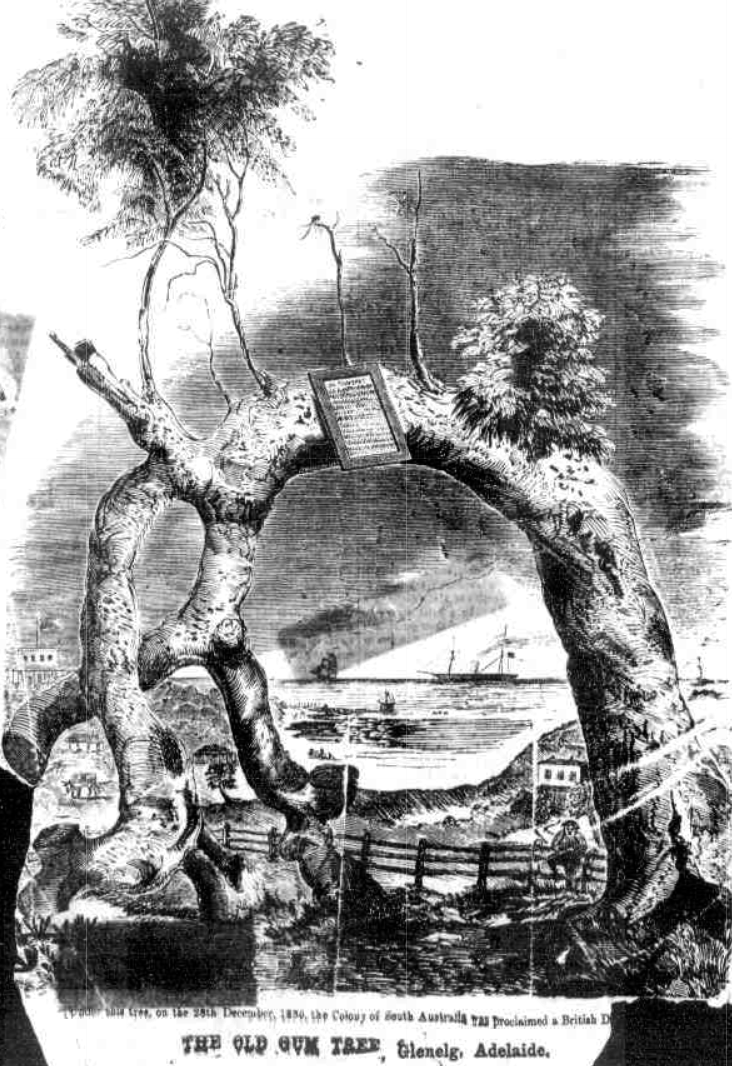
Old Gum Tree in 1867

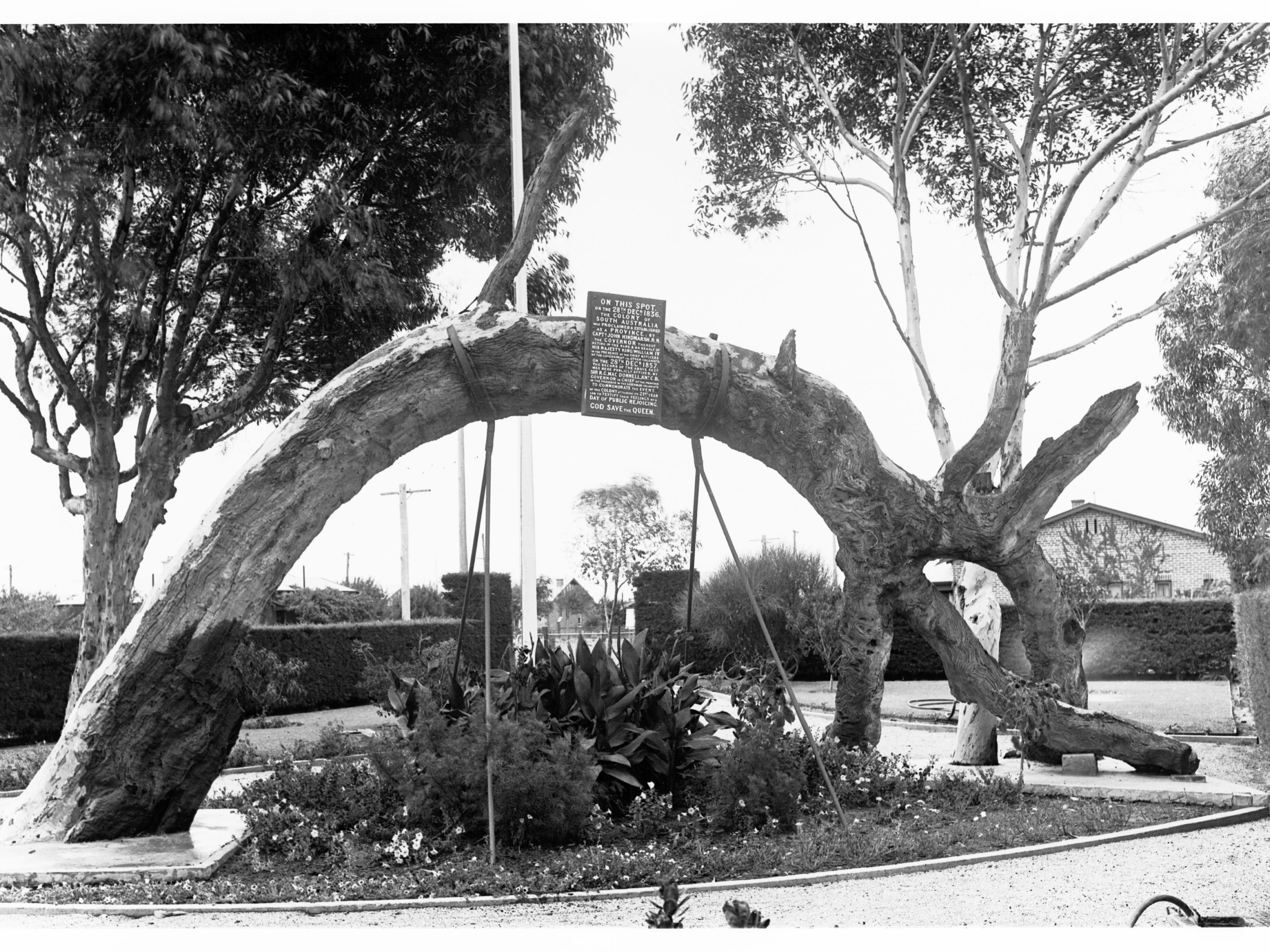
The Old Gum Tree, 1936

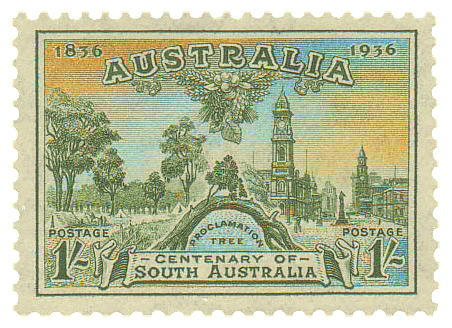
Postage stamp, Australia, 1936

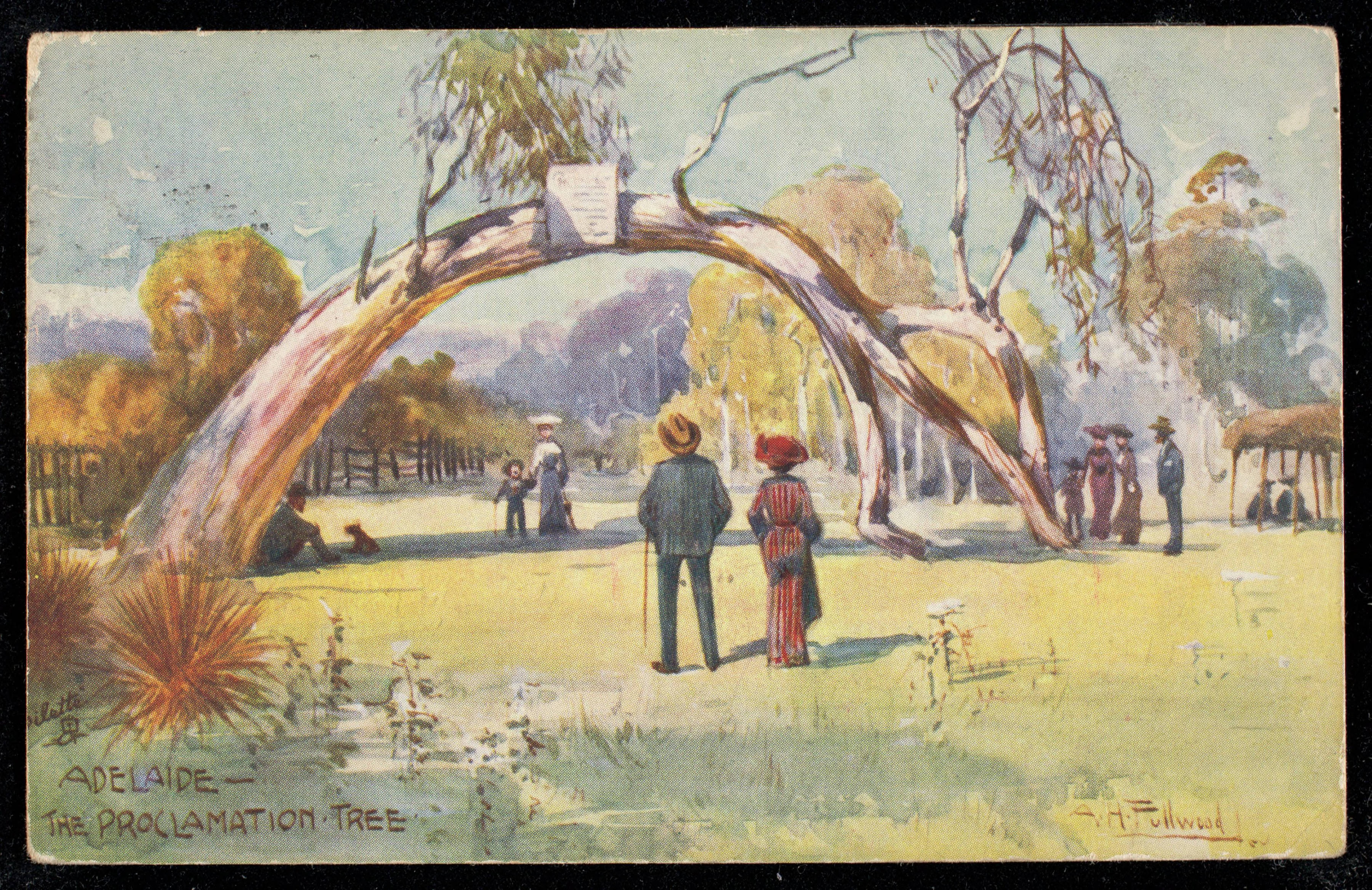
Postcard from 1903

== See also ==
- Holdfast Bay
- List of Adelaide parks and gardens
- List of named Eucalyptus trees
- List of individual trees
- Proclamation Day
