= Glenelg North, South Australia =

Glenelg North
- Suburb
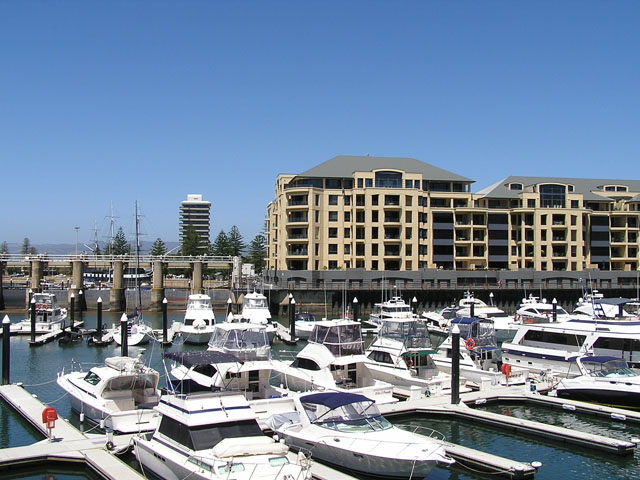
- Holdfast Quays Marina, Glenelg North

- Coordinates: 34°58′14″S 138°31′06″E
- Country: Australia
- State: South Australia
- City: Adelaide
- LGAs: City of West Torrens; City of Holdfast Bay
- Location: 9 km (5.6 mi) from Adelaide

Government
  - State electorate: Morphett
  - Federal divisions: Boothby; Hindmarsh

Population
  - Total: 6,594 (SAL 2021)
- Postcode: 5045
Suburbs around Glenelg North
	West Beach; Adelaide Airport	Adelaide Airport; Novar Gardens
Gulf St Vincent	Glenelg North	Novar Gardens
	Glenelg; Glenelg East	Glenelg East

Glenelg North is a seaside suburb of Adelaide, South Australia. It is located in both the City of Holdfast Bay and the City of West Torrens.

== Demographics ==
The 2011 Census by the Australian Bureau of Statistics counted 5,699 persons in Glenelg North on census night. Of these, 50.7% were male and 49.3% were female.

The majority of residents (72.9%) are of Australian birth, with the other common census response being England (7.6%).

The age distribution of Glenelg North residents is skewed towards a slightly higher age bracket than the greater Australian population. 72.9% of residents were over 25 years in 2006, compared to the Australian average of 66.5%; and 27.1% were younger than 25 years, compared to the Australian average of 33.5%.

== Community ==
The local newspaper is the Guardian Messenger. Other regional and national newspapers such as The Advertiser and The Australian are also available.

=== Schools ===
St Leonards Primary School, located on Jervois Street, is the local public school.

== Attractions ==
Glenelg North is the site of the Patawalonga boat haven and The Old Gum Tree.

It was home to a replica of the vessel HMS Buffalo, the ship that brought settlers to the state. The replica was fitted out as a restaurant.

=== Shopping and dining ===
The Jetty Road shopping and dining precinct is a short walk from the suburb.

=== Parks ===
There are parks and green spaces throughout Glenelg North.

=== Beach ===
Glenelg North Beach extends along the coastal length of the suburb until reaching neighbouring suburb West Beach.

== Transport ==
=== Roads ===
The suburb is serviced by the following main roads:

- Anzac Highway, connecting Adelaide to Glenelg
- Tapleys Hill Road, running north–south from Queenstown to Glenelg

=== Public transport ===
The suburb is serviced by bus routes, run by the Adelaide Metro:

== See also ==
- List of Adelaide suburbs
