= Cygnet (barque) =

Ship in the first fleet to South Australia

History

United Kingdom
- Name: Cygnet
- Owner: Thomas Ward (from 1829)
- Builder: John Gilmore and Company
- Launched: 1827

General characteristics
- Tons burthen: 238 tons
- Length: 91 feet (27.7 m)
- Beam: 24 feet (7.3 m)
- Draught: 16 feet (4.9 m)
- Sail plan: Barque

Cygnet was a barque built in 1827. It was 91 feet (27.7 m) long with a beam of 24 feet (7.3 m) and draught of 16 feet (4.9 m). It sailed as part of the First Fleet of South Australia in 1836.

Cygnet was built by John Gilmore and Company at Sulkea (across the Hooghly River from Calcutta) in India, and the primary material was teak. It first sailed from Calcutta to Singapore and Batavia. It then traded to Madras and Bombay before heading to London under Captain Morce in 1829. It was bought by Thomas Ward and registered in London with John Rolls as master.

Cygnet carried emigrants to the Swan River Colony, including George Lazenby who arrived in January 1833. Its next voyage was to Van Diemen's Land.

Cygnet was chartered in 1836 by the South Australian Colonization Commission to carry emigrants including many of the surveying staff for the new Colony of South Australia, including deputy surveyor George Strickland Kingston and assistant surveyor B. T. Finniss. Cygnet anchored in Nepean Bay on Kangaroo Island on 11 September 1836, and moved on to Holdfast Bay on 5 November 1836.

Cygnet was posted at Port Lincoln to await the Buffalo carrying Governor Hindmarsh to advise him that the new capital would be near Holdfast Bay and he should continue to there. Both ships then proceeded to Holdfast Bay together.

== Legacy ==
The longest river on Kangaroo Island and the related locality of Cygnet River are both named after this ship. The river empties into Nepean Bay.
