= Holdfast Bay =

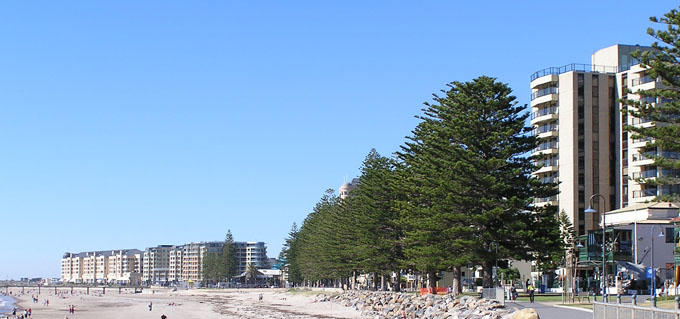
- Looking north along the beach at Holdfast Bay to Glenelg

- Location in South Australia
- Location: Gulf St Vincent, South Australia
- Coordinates: 34.97103°S 138.508099°E
- Type: Bay
- Primary outflows: Gulf St Vincent
- Basin countries: Australia
- Frozen: never
- Settlements: Glenelg, Glenelg North

Holdfast Bay is a small bay in Gulf St Vincent, next to Adelaide, South Australia. Along its shores lie the local government area of the City of Holdfast Bay and the suburbs of Glenelg and Glenelg North The colonial settlement at Holdfast Bay was the first seat of government of South Australia.

== European settlement on Holdfast Bay ==
The bay was named by Colonel William Light, South Australian surveyor general, in mid-1836. In his journal he expressed his pleasure at the quality of the anchorage after riding out a storm. Holdfast Bay was the site of the landings in 1836 and 1837 by pioneers who were to set up the colony of South Australia. On 8 November 1836 Robert Gouger, Colonial Secretary and Chief Magistrate, arrived there aboard the Africaine and set up camp near The Old Gum Tree. With the arrival of Governor Hindmarsh on 28 December and the proclamation of the new colony, the Holdfast Bay settlement became the first seat of government of South Australia. (It remained the seat of government until mid-March 1837.) On 31 December 1836 the Holdfast Bay settlement was renamed Glenelg. The Corporate Town of Glenelg (later City of Glenelg) was established at Glenelg in 1855 to locally govern the township and its surrounds.

== Diving and snorkeling sites ==
The Bay contains a combination of natural and artificial reefs accessible to divers and snorkelers.

=== Artificial reefs ===
The Brighton Jetty, the Glenelg Jetty and The Blocks can all be reached by swimming from the shore. The Blocks can also easily be reached by kayak. The Blocks is a disused maritime structure- a series of concrete and steel square columns that today act as an interrupted breakwater and artificial reef. Attractions at this site include seahorses and pipefish.

The Glenelg tyre reef is a series of tyre tetrahedrons that were deployed in 1983. According to the Scuba Divers Federation of South Australia, it is now in a state of decay. It is located 5 km west of Glenelg in 18 metres of water.

Two ships have been scuttled in Holdfast Bay, the Glenelg barge and the South Australian, known colloquially as The Dredge. Both lie in 15–20 metres of water and are accessible to divers.

=== Natural reefs ===
Several natural reefs occur in the bay, with depths ranging from 8 to 24 metres.

Devil's Elbow is a distinctive reef at 8–10 metres depth where two shelves meet perpendicularly. The southern end of the reef breaks down into rocky bommies. It is known for its giant Australian cuttlefish, and various nudibranchs.

Fred's Rock sits at 24 metres deep, and is believed by some to be a meteorite. It forms part of Fred's Ground, which includes the wreck of the Claris. Pelagic fishes school above it.

Leatherjacket Alley is a natural reef, located approximately 2 km northwest of Glenelg in 10 metres of water. The site presents a series of naturally formed gutters popular with many species of the eponymous fish.

Mac's Ground is a small reef 4.5 km west of Glenelg in 17 metres of water. The reef is about one metre above the surrounding seabed, is 150 metres long and features overhangs and a small cave.

Milkie's Reef is a rarely-visited natural reef located 4.5 km southwest of Glenelg in 17 metres of water. It is known for its abundance of spider crabs and huge variety of fish life.

Northern Outer Reef forms part of the remnant shoreline at 18–22 metres depth. It is approximately 100 metres long and presents a series of rocky ledges and overhangs. It supports many large sponges and is believed to be a recruitment area for Western blue devils.

Oliver's Reef lies offshore from Glenelg and south east of the Glenelg barge. The site is 18 metres deep and features rocky bommies and a large purple stony coral some 2 metres round.

Seacliff Reef is a natural reef that represents the remains of a 10,000-year-old shoreline. The seabed is at 12 to 15 metres, and the reef rises above it about a metre. It supports the largest known population of Western blue devils in the waters surrounding metropolitan Adelaide.
