= Africaine (1832 ship) =

Barque used to carry passengers and goods between Britain and its colonies

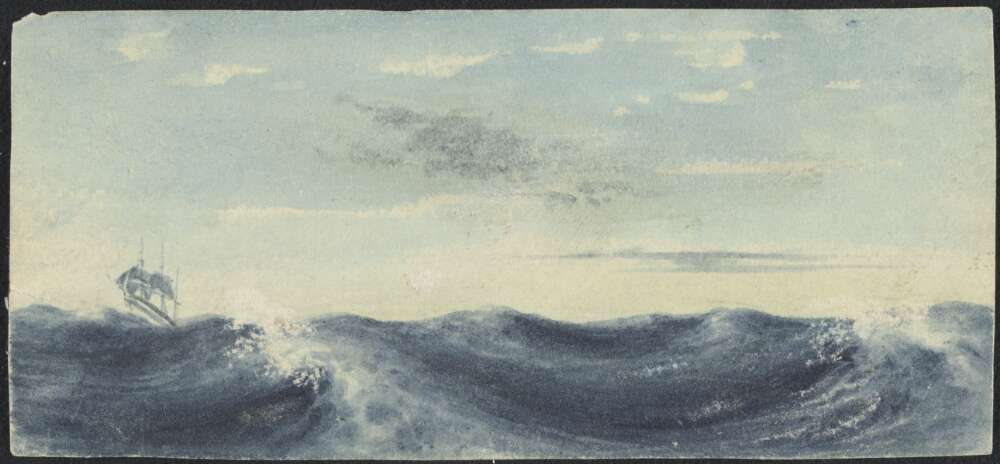
- The barque Africaine in the Indian Ocean, Wednesday 12 October 1836; watercolour by one of the passengers, John Michael Skipper in the First Fleet of South Australia

History

United Kingdom
- Name: Africaine
- Builder: Robert & Thomas Brown Jr., Jarrow, Newcastle upon Tyne
- Launched: 1831
- Fate: Wrecked 23 September 1843

General characteristics
- Tons burthen: 316 (bm)
- Length: 98 ft 9 in (30.1 m)
- Beam: 27 ft 0 in (8.2 m)
- Sail plan: Barque

Africaine (or African, or Africanus) was a barque launched in 1831 at Jarrow on the River Tyne in England. In 1836 she carried immigrants as part of the First Fleet of South Australia. She was wrecked on 23 September 1843.

== History ==
Africaine was a barque, an emigrant ship that played a significant role in the early days of Australian colonization. Built in 1832 in Jarrow on Tyne by the renowned shipbuilders Thomas and Robert Brown Junior, Africaine was a sturdy vessel with a tonnage of 317 tons. Its dimensions were 98 feet 9.5 inches in length, 27 feet 2.5 inches in beam, and 6 feet 7 inches in depth, making it well-suited for long voyages across the seas.

In its early years, Africaine was owned by Thomas Finlay and John Finlay Duff, who registered the vessel in London. By August 1837, ownership had changed hands to Michael Connolly, J. Griffiths, and William Dutton, with the ship now registered in Launceston, Tasmania. In February 1840, Connolly and Dutton became the sole owners, and by November 1841, James Henty had taken over ownership. The ship was transferred to Newcastle on Tyne in 1842.

Africaine embarked on several significant voyages during its lifetime, primarily serving as a passenger ship for emigrants. One of its notable journeys began on 27 June 1836, when it departed from London, carrying settlers bound for the newly established colony of South Australia. Africaine arrived at Holdfast Bay, near what is now Adelaide, on 13 November 1836, after a long and arduous voyage. The ship made several more voyages between Launceston and Port Adelaide, contributing to the growth of the young colony.

Africaine met a tragic end. On 23 September 1843, while on a voyage from North Shields to Quebec, the ship was wrecked near "Cape St Lawrence" (Cape North?). The wreck marked the end of a ship that had played a small yet significant part in the early history of Australian colonization, carrying people who would go on to shape the future of the continent.

== Career ==
Africaine first appeared in Lloyd's Register (LR) in 1832 as African, with Thompson, master, Fenwick, owner, and trade London–Quebec.

Africaine's next voyage was to Smyrna in what is now Turkey. On 8 April 1833, as she was sailing from Liverpool to Smyrna she grounded on Cape Trafalgar for about three hours. A coaster helped her off, but in doing so carried away her stream anchor and cable. Africaine, Thompson, master, then continued on her voyage on the 9th.

In 1834 and 1835, under command of John Finlay Duff, Africaine sailed via Calcutta, Mauritius, and Hobart to Sydney.

Robert Gouger and John Brown chartered Africaine in 1836 to carry goods and passengers as part of the First Fleet of South Australia. She departed London Docks on 28 June 1836 and arrived at Holdfast Bay on 8 November 1836. Duff remained the captain, with his new wife on board. (Note: The diary of one of the passengers, Mary Thomas, was later published as a book in 1915. The book was edited by her grandson.) Soon after unloading her passengers and cargo at Holdfast Bay, Africaine went on to Hobart Town in Van Diemen's Land (now Tasmania) to acquire more supplies. She arrived in ballast at Launceston on 13 March 1837 from Gulf St Vincent. She then traded between Hobart and Launceston.

In 1838 her owner became John Griffiths et al., of Launceston. In 1840, under the command of William Dutton she visited the whaling grounds of New Zealand. Then in November 1841 her owner became James Henty, also of Launceston.

Year	Master	Owner	Homeport	Trade	Source & notes
1840	McTaggart	J. Griffiths	Launceston	London–Australia	LR; new keel and small repairs 1834
1843	G. Coxon	G. Coxon	North Shields	Newcastle–London	LR; new keel and small repairs 1834, small repairs 1842

== Fate ==
Africaine was wrecked in a storm on 23 September 1843 with the loss of two of her crew. She was on a voyage from Newcastle to Quebec when she wrecked off "Cape St Lawrence" (Cape North?), Cape Breton Island. Her entry in LR for 1843 carries the annotation "LOST".
