= John Griffiths =

John Griffiths may refer to:

== Politicians and lawyers ==
- John Griffiths (Welsh politician) (born 1956), Welsh Labour Party politician
- John Griffiths (Conservative politician) (born 1953), British local government leader
- John Griffiths (Liberal politician) (born 1934), British politician and author
- John Calvert Griffiths (born 1931), former Attorney General of Hong Kong and lawyer
- John L. Griffiths (1855–1914), Consul General of the United States to Britain
- John Jones Griffiths (1839–1901), Welsh educationalist and politician

== Sportsmen ==
- John Griffiths (cricketer, born 1863) (1863–?), English cricketer
- John Griffiths (cricketer, born 1931) (1931–1982), cricketer
- Jack Griffiths (1909–1975), English footballer
- John Griffiths (footballer, born 1876) (1876–1953), English football wing half (Grimsby Town)
- John Griffiths (footballer, born 1951) (born 1951), English football midfielder (Aston Villa, Stockport County)
- John Griffiths (rugby union) (1948–2020), Australian rugby union player

== Other people ==
- John Griffiths (shipowner) (1801–1881), Australian colonial shipowner and builder
- John Griffiths (academic) (1806–1885), English academic and Warden of Wadham College, Oxford
- John Griffiths (Medal of Honor) (1835–?), American Civil War soldier and sailor and Medal of Honor recipient
- John Griffiths (artist) (1837–1918), artist who worked in India
- John Griffiths (curator) (1952–2010), Welsh museum curator
- John Griffiths (mathematician) (1837/8–1916), Welsh mathematician
- John Griffiths (musician) (born 1952), Australian vihuelist and musicologist
- John F. Griffiths (1926–2003), British and American climatologist
- John W. Griffiths (1809–1882), American naval architect
  - SS John W. Griffiths, a Liberty ship
- J. Gwyn Griffiths (1911–2004), Welsh poet, Egyptologist and nationalist political activist
- John Griffiths (surgeon) (1754–1822), Surgeon to Queen Charlotte's household
- John Griffiths (archdeacon of Llandaff) (1820–1897)
- John O. Griffiths (1923–2001), British philatelist
- John Fraser Griffiths (died 1971), South African who worked as a British colonial official

== See also ==
- Jonathan Griffiths, Welsh rugby footballer
- Jonathan Griffiths (shipowner) (1773–1839), English-born Australian convict, shipowner and builder
