= Alexander Campbell (sea captain) =

(1805–1890) farmer and mariner

Captain Alexander Campbell (15 March 1805 – 25 May 1890) was a Scottish whaler, master mariner and notable figure in the British colonisation of the Port Fairy–Warrnambool region of Australia.

== Early life ==
Alexander Campbell was born on 15 March 1805 at Sunipol on the Isle of Mull in Scotland. He was the son of a farmer who was involved in the raising and shipping of livestock from Mull to the markets on the mainland.

== Van Diemen's Land ==
Two of Campbell's brothers, Colin and Neil, emigrated to Van Diemen's Land in the early 1820s, to take up land. Alexander decided to join them, and early in 1825 he sailed in the barque Triton arriving in Hobart in October of that year. Campbell met his brother Colin, who had taken up a farm at White Hills, near Launceston. Alexander managed the farm, growing wheat and raising cattle and sheep. He was later employed by Simeon Lord to manage the Bona Vista Station, on the South Esk River. In 1829, Campbell returned to his brother's farm at White Hills. During this period, he took an active role in the Black War between British settlers and the Aboriginal Tasmanians. In 1830 he was placed in charge of 15 armed convicts as part of the massive Black Line campaign which scoured the settled areas for native people aiming to trap them at the Tasman Peninsula. At this time Campbell met with John Batman and Governor George Arthur. For his services, he obtained a land grant of 320 acres, which he subsequently sold for £120.

== Whaling ==
In 1831, Campbell went to Sydney where he was informed about the profitable sperm whaling industry. He joined the Sir William Wallace, a vessel of 272 tons, which set out on an extensive whaling voyage lasting two years, visiting the waters around the New Hebrides and the coast of Japan. In 1835 Campbell joined the crew of the whaling schooner Mars which hunted the animals around New Zealand. He was the first mate on the Hobart whaler Socrates in 1835. He later commanded the Hobart whaling ship Pet (1849-50).

== Portland Bay ==
In 1836 Campbell was employed to take charge of the whaling station at Portland Bay. Campbell joined other whaling captains such as John and Charles Mills, William Dutton, and Captain John Griffiths in utilising Portland Bay as a base for whaling operations in this area.

== Port Fairy ==
In 1837, Campbell decided to construct a whaling station at Port Fairy to the east of Portland Bay. Houses were soon built on Griffiths Island just off the coast of the port. This whaling establishment proved successful with Captain Campbell securing 220 tons of oil and 13 tons of whalebone in the first season. Campbell, in conjunction with John Griffiths and Michael Connolly, set up a farming and whaling company and sheep were transported into Port Fairy. A sheep station known as "The Farm" was formed, which afterwards became the Farnham Estate. Aboriginal people in the area being dispossessed of their land took to taking large amounts of these sheep and the colonists formed a punitive expedition under Mr McDonald, and punished them severely. Campbell had an Aboriginal servant whom he named "Sou-wester".

In 1839, when the vessel Children was wrecked thirty miles east of Port Fairy, Campbell was largely responsible for saving eighteen lives.

Conflict with the local Aboriginal people flared again in 1842, and Campbell was one of a number of colonists in the region who petitioned the government for armed protection.

In 1842 the whaling and farming company Campbell had formed with Griffiths and Connolly failed. He lost the whole of his savings. Ten thousand sheep and 2,500 head of cattle were sold off. All that was left to Captain Campbell was a land claim extending to the Hopkins River, which included the site of the future town of Warrnambool. He later sold this land for £80.

He captained various vessels trading between the ports of Sydney, Launceston, Port Fairy, and Melbourne. His business partner John Griffiths soon afterwards re-established the whaling station at Port Fairy again, and Captain Campbell joined in the enterprise. In 1844, while living there, he married his wife, Mary Ann Coulson (16 June 1817 - 17 Sept 1902). During the next three years Captain Campbell continued whaling and trading out of Port Fairy. By the year 1847, however, whaling had ceased to be profitable and Campbell moved into the business of salvaging and on-selling ships. He also built a flour mill at Rosebrook not far from Port Fairy.

Rolf Boldrewood wrote about Alexander Campbell in his biographical novel Old Melbourne Memories describing him as "a stalwart Highlander, long known as Port Fairy Campbell."

== Melbourne harbourmaster and later life ==
In 1851 Campbell obtained the appointment of assistant harbourmaster of the Port of Melbourne, and became the chief harbourmaster of that port by 1863. He continued in this position until 1869, when he retired at the age of 64. In retirement, he established a farm at Fulham in Gippsland but later returned to live in Melbourne at Caroline Street in South Yarra, where he died in 1890. He was buried in Brighton cemetery.

== Legacy ==
Port Campbell, a harbour Campbell took refuge in during a storm in 1843, was named after him.
