= Griffiths Island =

Island in Victoria, Australia

Griffiths
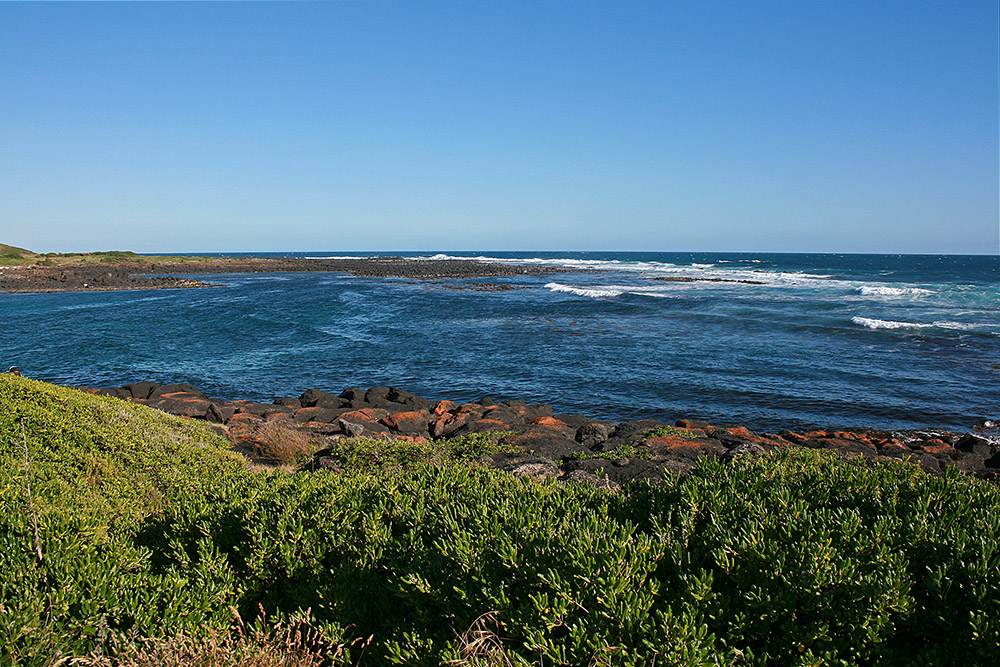
- The original mouth of the Moyne River, with the western end of Griffiths Island behind

- Location of Griffiths Island in Victoria
- Etymology: Jonathan Griffiths

Geography
- Location: Western District, Victoria
- Coordinates: 38°23′36″S 142°14′45″E
- Adjacent to: Bass Strait, Southern Ocean
- Total islands: 3
- Major islands: Griffiths Island
- Area: 31 ha (77 acres)
- Length: 1.5 km (0.93 mi)
- Width: 0.8 km (0.5 mi)

Administration
- Australia

Griffiths Island, sometimes incorrectly spelled as Griffith Island or Griffitts Island, lies at the mouth of the Moyne River next to, and within the bounds of, the town of Port Fairy, in the Western District of the state of Victoria in Australia. Griffiths now has no permanent inhabitants, but is connected to the mainland by a causeway and is accessible on foot. It forms part of the Port Fairy and Belfast Coastline Protection Reserve and, as well as being a tourist attraction, is an important site in the context of the history of European settlement of western Victoria. It is managed by the Moyne Shire Council.

== History ==
Griffiths Island Lighthouse
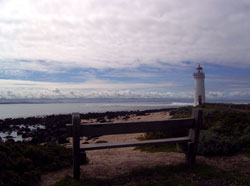
- Location: Port Fairy; Victoria; Australia
- Coordinates: 38°23′06″S 142°15′04″E

Tower
- Constructed: 1859
- Construction: bluestone tower
- Height: 11 metres (36 feet)
- Shape: cylindrical tower with balcony and lantern
- Markings: white tower with red trim and lantern

Light
- First lit: 1859
- Focal height: 12.5 metres (41 feet)
- Lens: catadioptric lantern
- Range: 22 kilometres (14 miles)
- Characteristic: Fl (2) W 10 s.

There is little surviving evidence of Aboriginal use of the island, though it was visited by the local Gunditjmara people, who knew it as Moleen. Following commercial investigation of the western Victorian coast, it was named after John Griffiths, an entrepreneur and merchant from Launceston in northern Tasmania, who figures prominently in the early history of the area. From the mid-1830s until 1843 the island served as a base for a bay whaling station for southern right whales, until the supply of whales was exhausted and the industry went into terminal decline. Some shipbuilding also took place during the 1840s. The abandoned whaling station buildings were later used until 1854 by Flora Dunlop, widow of Victorian politician Alexander Dunlop, as a 'mission' for young Aborigines. Because of its historic and archaeological significance, the island has been listed on the Victorian Heritage Register (H1659).

== Lighthouse ==
Griffiths Island Lighthouse was built in 1859 as a navigation aid at a time when Port Fairy was becoming an important trading port for western Victoria. Extensive harbour works undertaken then and subsequently, mainly to improve the navigability of the Moyne River and its approaches, have affected the shape and boundaries of the island. The lighthouse is operated by the Victorian Channels Authority, part of the Port of Melbourne Corporation. It was constructed on what was then Rabbit Island, at the eastern end of Griffiths, from local bluestone by Scottish stonemasons. The stairway was constructed with each step being inserted in the next course of stone in the outer wall. The lighthouse was initially staffed by two keepers. The last keeper to live on the island was there from 1929 to 1954, when the light was automated; the two stone keepers’ cottages were subsequently demolished in about 1956.

== Description ==
The low-lying island is about 1.5 kilometres (0.93 miles) long and 0.8 kilometres (0.50 miles) wide at its widest point, with an area of about 31 hectares (77 acres). It is bordered on its northern side by the Moyne River, which has been channeled between stone 'training walls' and provides easy access by sea to the port of Port Fairy. Originally a cluster of three separate islands – Goat, Rabbit and Griffiths – harbour works and coastal accretion have consolidated them into a single island which protects the mouth of the Moyne and shelters Port Fairy Bay.

=== Geology ===
Griffiths is an isolated outcrop of basaltic reefs and boulders on a substrate of early Pleistocene limestone, with overlying calcareous sand. It was formed by lava flows from Mount Rouse, a volcano near Penshurst, that reached the coast some 3–400,000 years ago. It is bounded in part by collapsed lava tunnels, such as the South West Passage across which the causeway was constructed. More recent limestone, about 100,000 years old, occurs on the southern coast of the island. Holocene dunes which cover parts of the island are about 6000 years old.

=== Flora ===
Griffiths Island lies in the Warrnambool Plain Bioregion. The original vegetation would have been similar to that of nearby areas, consisting of coastal shrubland, grassland and woodland. It has been heavily modified by the various human activities the island has been subject to. Predominant native plant species include bower spinach, small leaved clematis, seaberry saltbush, coast beard-heath, cushion bush, karkalla, common boobialla, knobby club-sedge, coast spear-grass, coast sword-sedge, kangaroo apple, coast daisy bush, coast tussock-grass, hairy spinifex and bidgee-widgee. marram grass was extensively planted in the past in an attempt to mitigate erosion.

=== Fauna ===
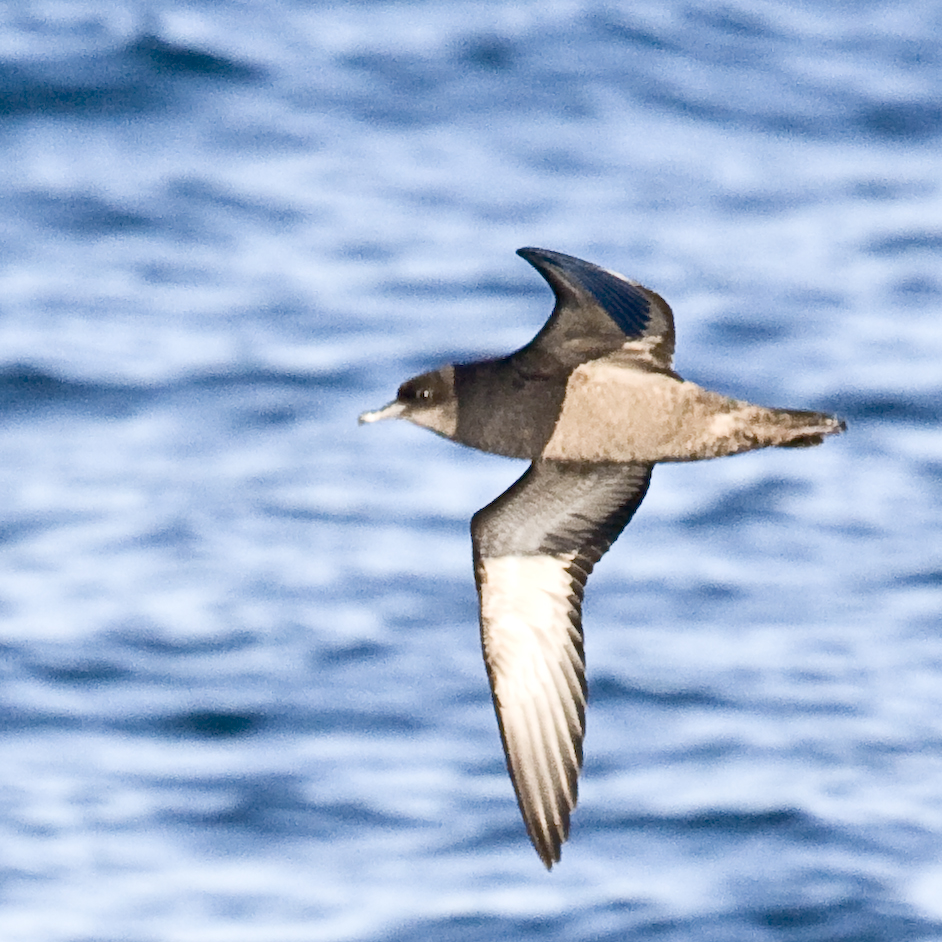
The island is home to a large colony of short-tailed shearwaters

Some 80–90 bird species have been recorded from the island, especially seabirds and waders. There is a large breeding colony of short-tailed shearwaters, locally known as 'muttonbirds', with an estimated 100,000 burrows (of which probably fewer than half are occupied during the September–April breeding season). The shearwater colony is a tourist attraction in spring and summer, with a viewing platform constructed to facilitate watching the birds as they return in a swarm to their burrows at dusk. Other animals resident on the island include swamp wallabies, short-beaked echidnas, blue-tongued lizards and tiger snakes.
