= Jack Griffiths (disambiguation) =

Jack Griffiths may refer to:-

- Jack Griffiths (1909-1975), English footballer
- Jack Griffiths (rugby union) (1912-2001), New Zealand rugby union player
- Jack Griffiths (footballer, born 2005) (born 2005), English footballer, see 2025–26 Rochdale A.F.C. season
- Jack Griffiths (bowls), Welsh lawn bowler

== See also ==
- John Griffiths
