= Anthophyllum =

Anthophyllum may refer to synonyms of two different genera:

- Caryophyllia, a genus of corals
- Ficinia, a genus of sedges
