= Moyne River =

River in Victoria, Australia

Moyne
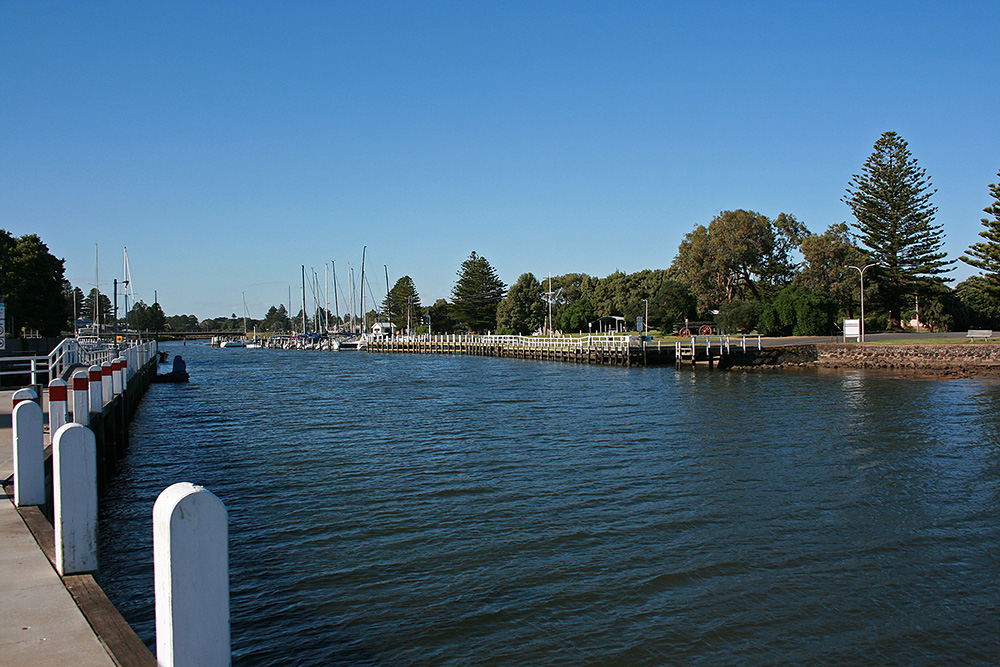
- The wharves and harbour on the Moyne River at Port Fairy

- Location of the Moyne River mouth in Victoria

Location
- Country: Australia
- State: Victoria
- Region: Victorian Midlands (IBRA), Western District
- Local government area: Moyne Shire
- Town: Port Fairy

Physical characteristics
- Source
  - location: near Stonefield
  - elevation: 189 m (620 ft)
- Mouth: Port Fairy Bay, Bass Strait
  - location: Port Fairy
  - coordinates: 38°23′18″S 142°15′3″E
  - elevation: 0 m (0 ft)
- Length: 82 km (51 mi)
- Basin size: 797 km^{2} (308 sq mi)

Basin features
- River system: Glenelg Hopkins catchment
- Tributaries
  - left: Gully Creek
  - right: Back Creek (Moyne Shire, Victoria)
- Waterfall: Moyne Falls

The Moyne River, a perennial river of the Glenelg Hopkins catchment, is located in the Western District of Victoria, Australia.

== Course and features ==
The Moyne River rises near Stonefield, from the edge of the lava flows west-southwest of Penshurst. The river flows generally south, joined by two minor tributaries, spills into the Belfast Lough and then reaches its mouth to empty into Port Fairy Bay in the Bass Strait near Port Fairy. The river descends 190 metres (620 ft) over its 82-kilometre (51 mi) course.

The mouth of the river has been significantly altered. The river originally spilled into the Bass Strait, south of the town of Port Fairy, through a series of narrow channels that led westward from the site of the present-day mouth. At that stage, the southern outlet of the Moyne, the Back Passage, was narrow and the opening to the sea was often too rough for boats to leave or enter the port; the main eastern outlet was blocked by a shallow sand bar. These navigational impediments led to the construction of a jetty from Flagstaff Hill and a boulder wall breakwater between Griffiths Island and Rabbit Island. Training walls constructed in the 1870s curve from the northern part of Griffiths Island through the sand bar. These structures rapidly led to the accumulation of large amounts of sand on the north coast of Griffiths Island and back shore erosion north of the breakwaters. A protective stone wall was added in 1911.

== See also ==
- List of rivers in Victoria
- Griffiths Island
