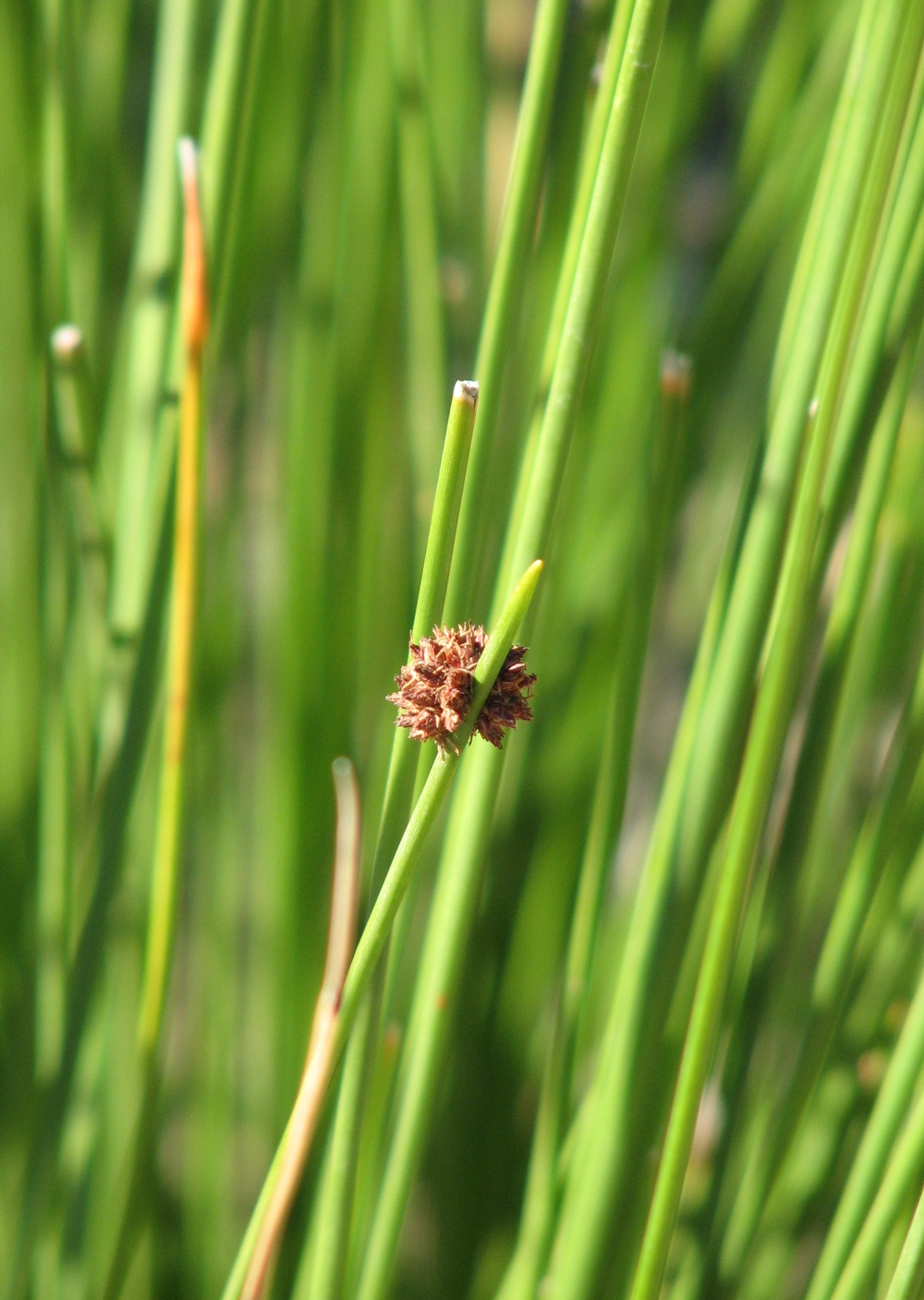

Scientific classification
- Kingdom: Plantae
- Clade: Embryophytes
- Clade: Tracheophytes
- Clade: Spermatophytes
- Clade: Angiosperms
- Clade: Monocots
- Clade: Commelinids
- Order: Poales
- Family: Cyperaceae
- Genus: Ficinia
- Species: F. nodosa

Binomial name
- Ficinia nodosa (Rottb.) Goetgh. et al.

Synonyms
- Scirpus nodosus Rottb.; Isolepis nodosa (Rottb.) R.Br.; "Scirpoides nodosus" (Rottb.) Soják; "Holoschoenus nodosus" (Rottb.) A. Dietr.

= Ficinia nodosa =

Species of plant

Ficinia nodosa, the knotted club-rush or knobby club-rush, is a rhizomatous perennial in the family Cyperaceae, native to South Africa, Australia, and New Zealand. Widespread in the Southern Hemisphere, Ficinia nodosa grows to between 15 and 220 cm in height. Although it grows best in sandy, salty soil, the plant grows in a wide variety of environments from coastal sand dunes to alpine regions. F. nodosa’s appearance is characterised by dense clusters of long green stems topped with small, rounded flowers often remaining throughout the year.

== Description ==
Ficinia nodosa, a grass-like sedge, grows to roughly 100 centimetres (39 in) in height, with its smooth, green-yellow stems spreading up to 200 centimetres (79 in) in diameter. The stems themselves grow to between 15 and 100 centimetres (5.9 and 39.4 in) in length and 1 to 2 millimetres (0.039 to 0.079 in) in diameter. The flowers appear as brown-orange clumps just below the tip of the stems, with hemispherical spikelets of 7–20 millimetres (0.28–0.79 in) in diameter sitting underneath a bract. The fruit, found within the flower-heads, are an irregularly shaped dark brown to black nut with a diameter of approximately 1 mm. Ficinia nodosa flowers in the summer season of the Southern Hemisphere, between September and December, while the seeds appear for a longer period between November and May. The seedhead is often retained year-round.

Ficinia nodosa is distinguished from similar plants such as those of the genus Isolepsis by Ficinia nodosa’s larger growth patterns and rigid, wooded stems. F. nodosa is commonly confused with Scirpus dioecus, and at one point was believed to be the same species.

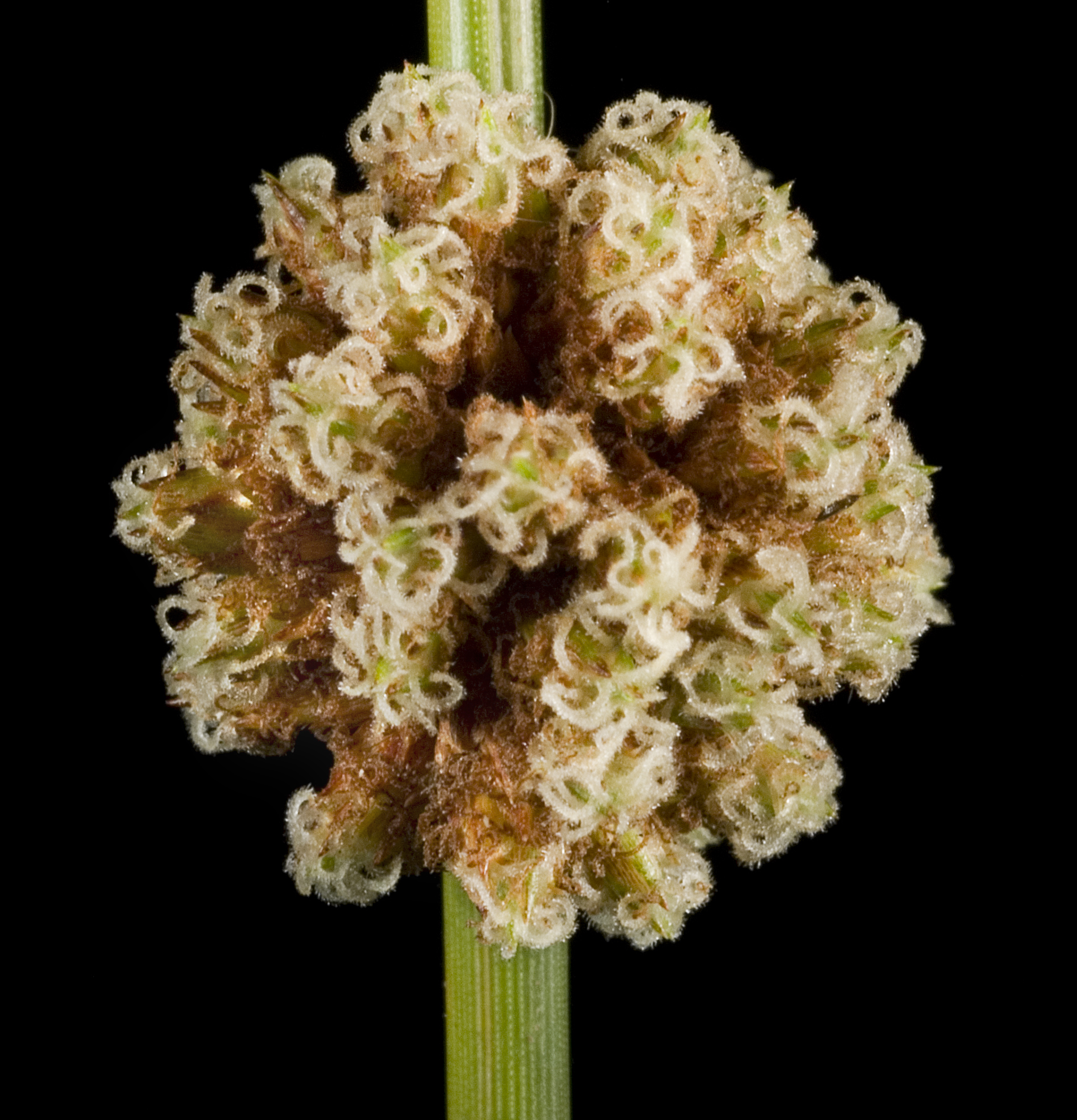
female phase

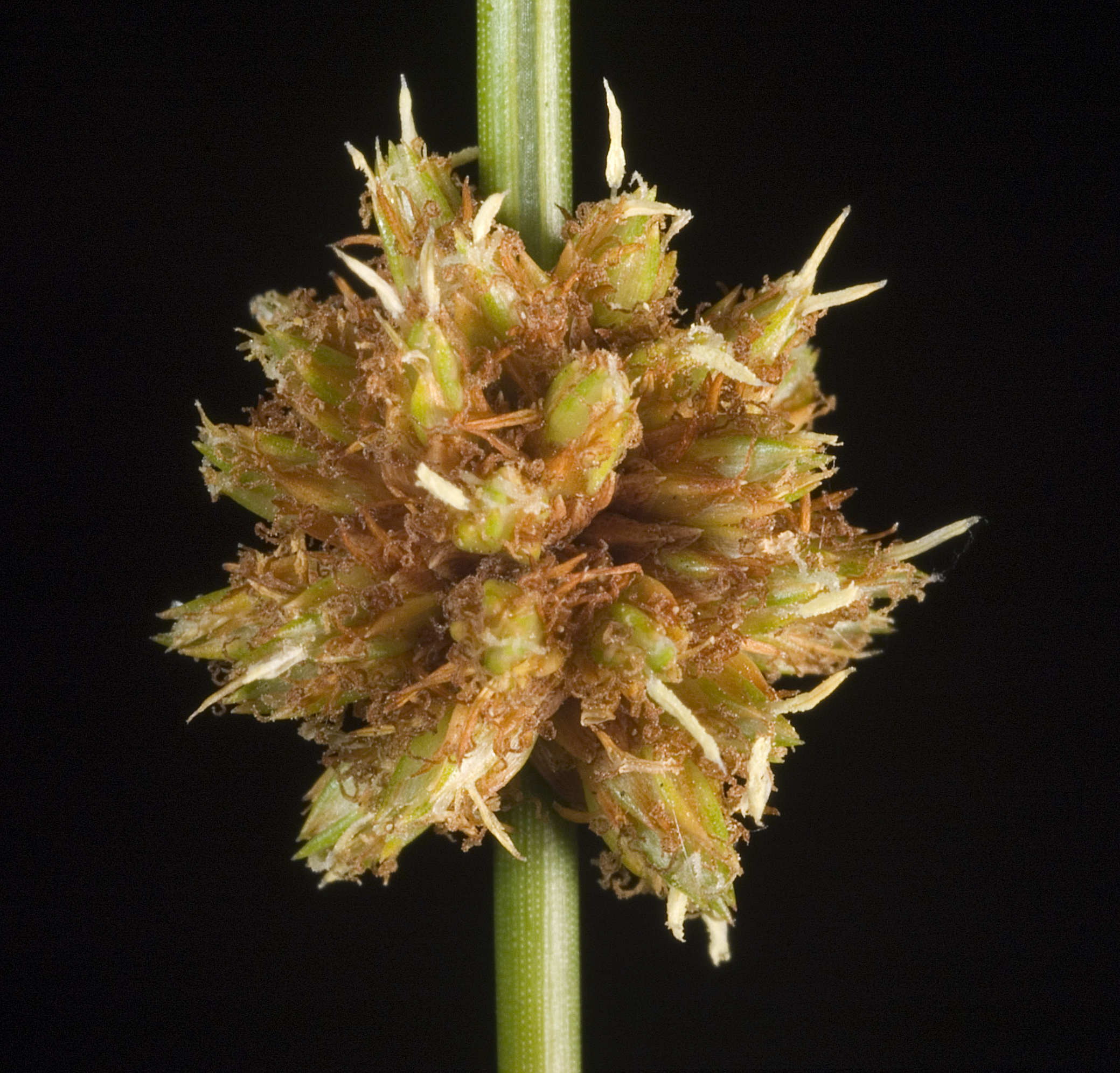
male phase

== Taxonomy ==
Ficinia nodosa has a complicated taxonomic history, with several synonymic names, including the basionym Scirpus nodosus, as well as Isolepsis nodosa, Holoschoenus nodosus, Scirpoides nodosus, and the common names knobby club-rush, and knotted club-rush. In New Zealand, it also has the common names wīwī, from the Māori name, and ethel sedge.

Ficinia nodosa was first classified by Danish botanist Christen Friis Rottbøll in 1772 from a specimen provided by Johann Gerhard König, with further information published by Rottbøll in 1773. Rottbøll named the plant Scirpus nodosus. Further examination of specimens of nodosa collected in Tasmania and King George’s Sound was done by Robert Brown in 1802 and 1805 respectively. Brown designated the species as Isolepsis nodosa, before Johann Otto Boeckeler, a German botanist specialising in plants in the Cyperaceae family, reclassified the species as Scirpus once again.

F. nodosa was historically considered a part of the Scirpus or Isolepsis genera due to the plant’s geographical distribution. Ficinia was originally believed to grow only in sub-Saharan Africa, which contrasted the discovery of nodosa in Australia and New Zealand and therefore, nodosa was assigned to the more widespread Scirpus and Isolepsis genera.

Reassignment of nodosa to the Ficinia genus occurred in 2000, when DNA studies identified Ficinia nodosa’s woody rhizome and presence of a gynophore as evidence for the plant’s inclusion in Ficinia. The decision to include nodosa in the Ficinia genus greatly extended the range of distribution of Ficnia. Despite the classification as Ficinia due to the presence of a gynophore and distribution, some researchers suggest a wider range of plants of similar structure need to be studied to come to a decisive agreement about F. nodosa.

== Distribution and habitat ==
Ficinia nodosa is known to grow natively in South Africa, Australia, and New Zealand, including the Kermadec, Three Kings, Stewart, and Chatham Islands. It is commonly found on the island of Saint Helena, in temperate areas of South America, and in Namibia.

Across the range of F. nodosa, the plant grows in sparsely populated coastal regions such as sand dunes and sedgelands but is also found in alpine climates of New Zealand up to 700 metres (2,300 ft) above sea level. Other research has suggested the plant can be found at elevations of up to 1,500 metres (4,900 ft) above sea level. The species is also very commonly found in salt marshes.

In South Africa, F. nodosa grows across the east coast, and is common in numerous locations on the Cape Peninsula, and around the Orange River. No significant variation exists between specimens collected in or out of Africa, with size of the plant differing within the same region. Specimens collected from the Orange Free State were shorter and smaller than those collected in Namibia, while specimens collected from the Cape Peninsula were diverse in size.

In Australia, F. nodosa is found throughout the continent, with a distribution across coastal and saltwater habitats in all states except the Northern Territory, though some evidence suggests the distribution includes the Northern Territory. F. nodosa is also commonly found in wet and moist non-saline areas of Victoria.

F. nodosa is found in a wide variety of habitats due to its ability to grow in numerous conditions of soil, water level, water type, temperature, and sun exposure. The plant thrives in sandy and gravelly soils with varying pH levels, and does best in direct sunlight, with access to some water. In sand dune environments, nodosa often grows in dense clumps on backdunes. The plants establish themselves through windborne seeds carried to an area, before expanding utilising rhizomes and new seeds.

Reports of specimens of F. nodosa growing in Chile exist, though more research is needed to determine whether the plant is native to the region.

== Ecology ==
F. nodosa is a long-living rhizomatous perennial with flowers growing in the summer and often remaining on the plant throughout the year, giving the appearance of year-round flowering. The sedge grows alongside several native plants in New Zealand dune ecosystems, such as sand coprosma (Coprosma acerosa), prostrate snowberry (Pernettya macrostigma), and tauhinu (Ozothamnus leptophyllus).

One study found that the growth of F. nodosa plants was inhibited by a process known as allelopathy, whereby the chemicals produced by one species limit the growth of surrounding species. On New South Wales coast in Australia, F. nodosa appeared to be inhibited by the presence of bitou bush extracts in the soil in which the plant was growing. Bitou bush is an invasive species which was planted in dune ecosystems in an attempt to stabilise the sand dunes between 1946 and 1964. Further tests showed that chemicals extracted from Acacia longifolia roots and soil also inhibited the growth of seedlings of F. nodosa. Despite F. nodosa being widespread and common across the Southern Hemisphere, in coastal regions of New South Wales F. nodosa competes with both the invasive bitou bush and native dominant species Acacia longifolia.

== Uses ==
Research has shown that F. nodosa could be utilised in biofiltration systems such as constructed wetlands to remove heavy metals, phosphorus and nitrogen concentrations in storm water runoff, particularly in saline environments, where F. nodosa occurs natively. Due to the plant’s ability to grow well in salt-water conditions, along with nodosa’s ability to collect large amounts of nitrogen in its shoots, the plant makes an excellent candidate for constructed floating wetlands in native regions. If grown alongside Phragmites australis, Sarcocornia quinqueflora, and Baumea juncea, the shoots and roots of the plant could be harvested to reduce nitrogen and phosphorus concentrations. F. nodosa is particularly effective for nitrogen removal due to its ability to sustain a constant level of nitrogen removal for salt concentrations below 10.4 mS cm^{-1}.

The Māori people utilised several native sedges and similar plants, including F. nodosa, to thatch the roofs of Wharenuis.

F. nodosa is commonly recommended as a sand binder or as a mixed landscape feature around bodies of water such as filtration beds and ponds in the native regions of Victoria, and South Australia. Furthermore, F. nodosa is often found to control sand movement in dune slacks due to its binding abilities, and therefore, is often used in dune restoration projects within its native range.
