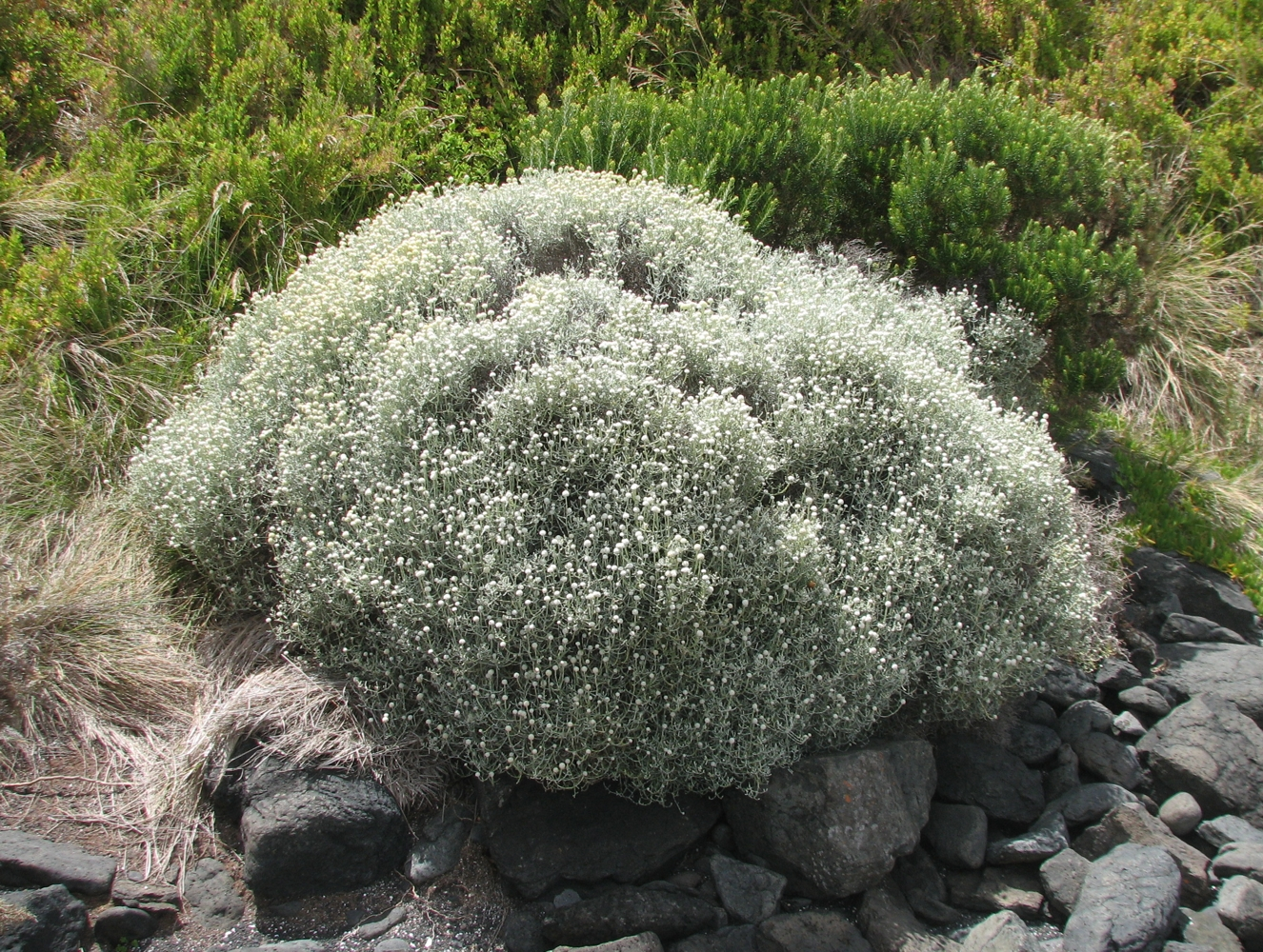
- Leucophyta brownii, Mornington Peninsula, Victoria
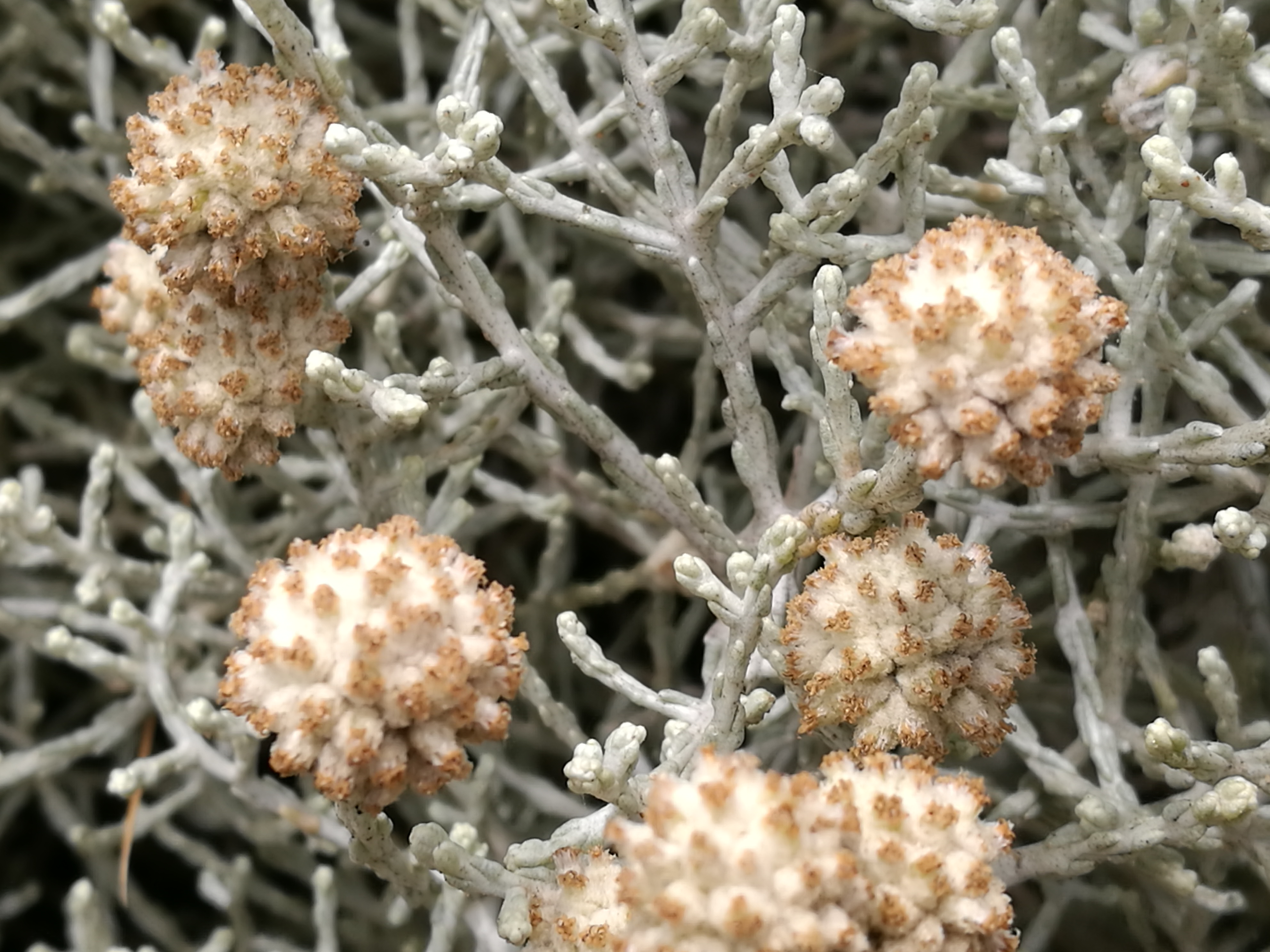
- Leucophyta brownii, Gippsland, Victoria

Scientific classification
- Kingdom: Plantae
- Clade: Tracheophytes
- Clade: Angiosperms
- Clade: Eudicots
- Clade: Asterids
- Order: Asterales
- Family: Asteraceae
- Subfamily: Asteroideae
- Tribe: Gnaphalieae
- Genus: Leucophyta; R.Br.
- Species: L. brownii

Binomial name
- Leucophyta brownii Cass.

Synonyms
- Calocephalus brownii (Cass.) F.Muell.

= Leucophyta =

Species of plant

Leucophyta is a plant genus which is endemic to Australia. The genus was first formally described by botanist Robert Brown in 1818.

The sole species in the genus is Leucophyta brownii, also known as cushion bush. In 1891, German botanist Otto Kuntze assigned a number of species to this genus in his publication Revisio Generum Plantarum but none of his name combinations have currency, those species being presently divided between the genera Balladonia, Blennospora, Calocephalus and Gnephosis.

Leucophyta brownii is a small, rounded shrub with tangled tomentose branchlets that give it a silvery appearance. Although it can grow up to a metre high, it is more usually 0.2 to 0.7 metres high. It produces flowers during summer (December to February in Australia), which are white-yellow globular heads and about 1 cm in diameter.

The species is common in cultivation in Australia, with a selected dwarf form from Tasmania, known by the cultivar name 'Silver Nugget', also grown.

== Habitat ==
Leucophyta brownii is found in coastal environments. It commonly occurs on the exposed faces of cliffs and dunes on the south coast of Australia. It is highly tolerant of prevailing winds, sea spray, drought and frost, and grows on predominantly sand or sandstone derived soil. Further, the soil can be highly alkaline when sand is composed of calcium carbonate. It grows most successfully in full sun.

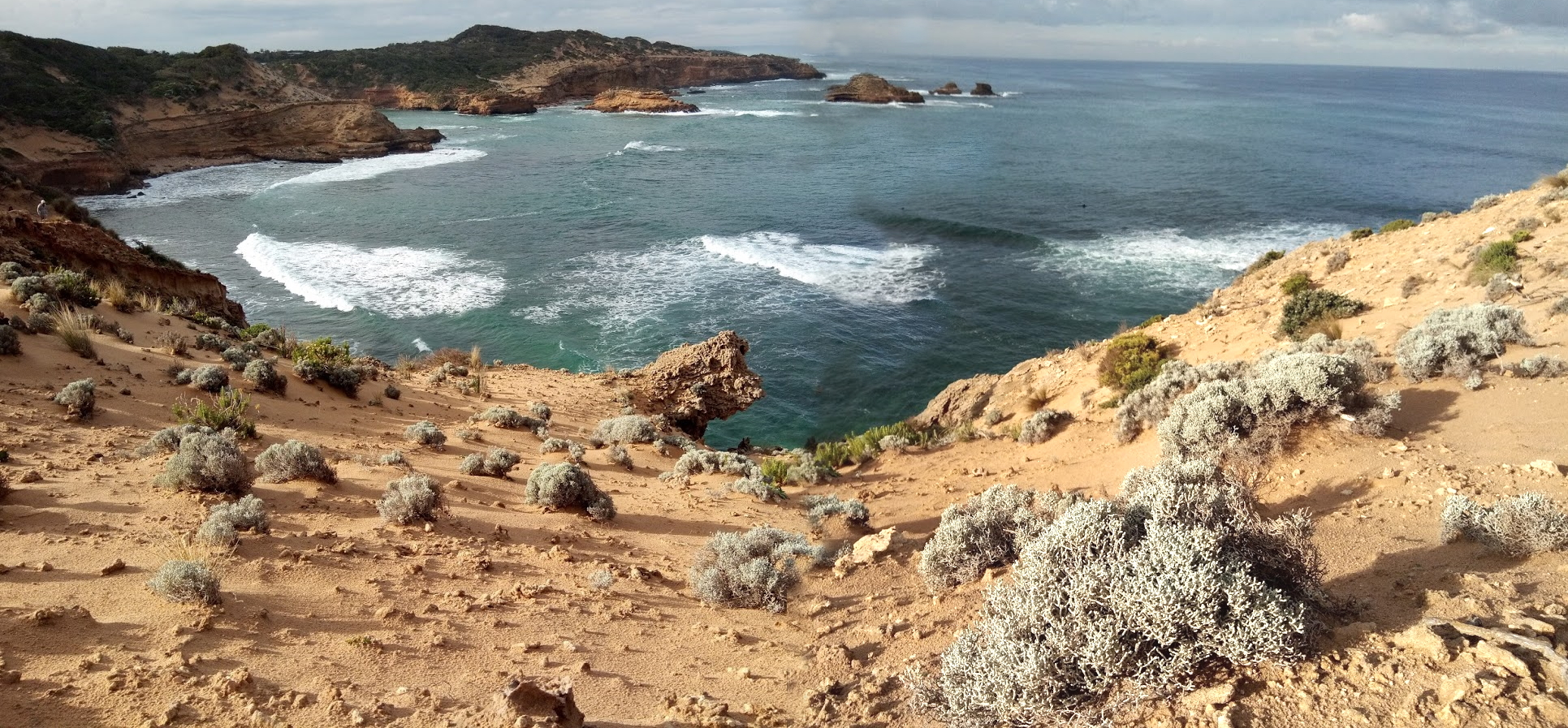
An example of the habitat where Leucophyta brownii is found. The image taken at Jubilee Point, Sorrento, Victoria.
