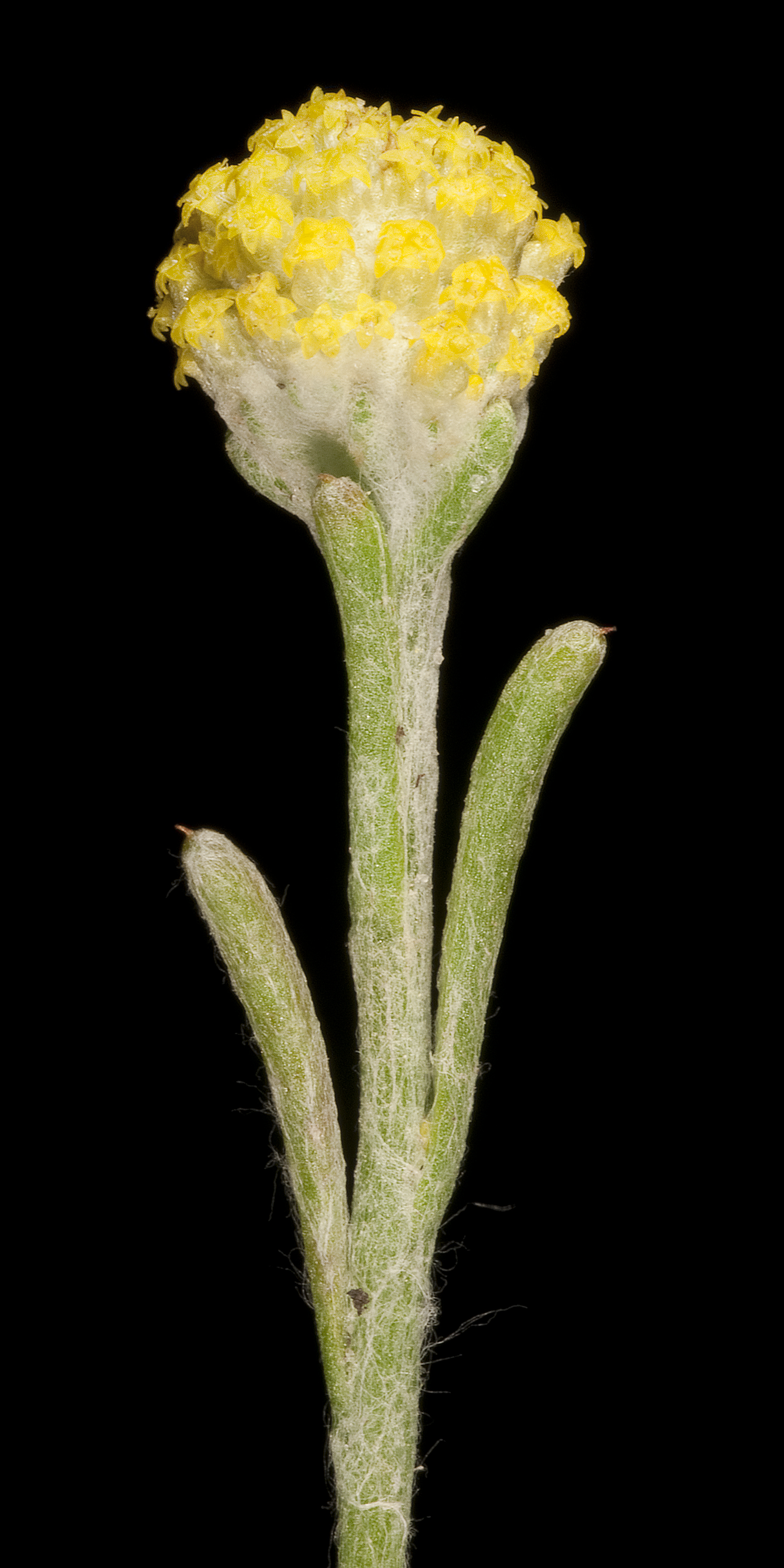

Scientific classification
- Kingdom: Plantae
- Clade: Tracheophytes
- Clade: Angiosperms
- Clade: Eudicots
- Clade: Asterids
- Order: Asterales
- Family: Asteraceae
- Genus: Blennospora
- Species: B. phlegmatocarpa

Binomial name
- Blennospora phlegmatocarpa (Diels)P.S.Short

Synonyms
- Calocephalus phlegmatocarpus Diels; Calocephalus stowardii S.Moore

= Blennospora phlegmatocarpa =

Species of flowering plant

Blennospora phlegmatocarpa is a herb species in the family Asteraceae. It is found in Western Australia.

It is an erect annual growing from 2 to 5 cm high, which forms dense carpets, on saline flats in sandy soils. Its yellow flowers are seen from September to October.

The species was first described in 1905 as Calocephalus phlegmatocarpus by Ludwig Diels, but was assigned to the genus, Blennospora by Philip Short in 1981.
