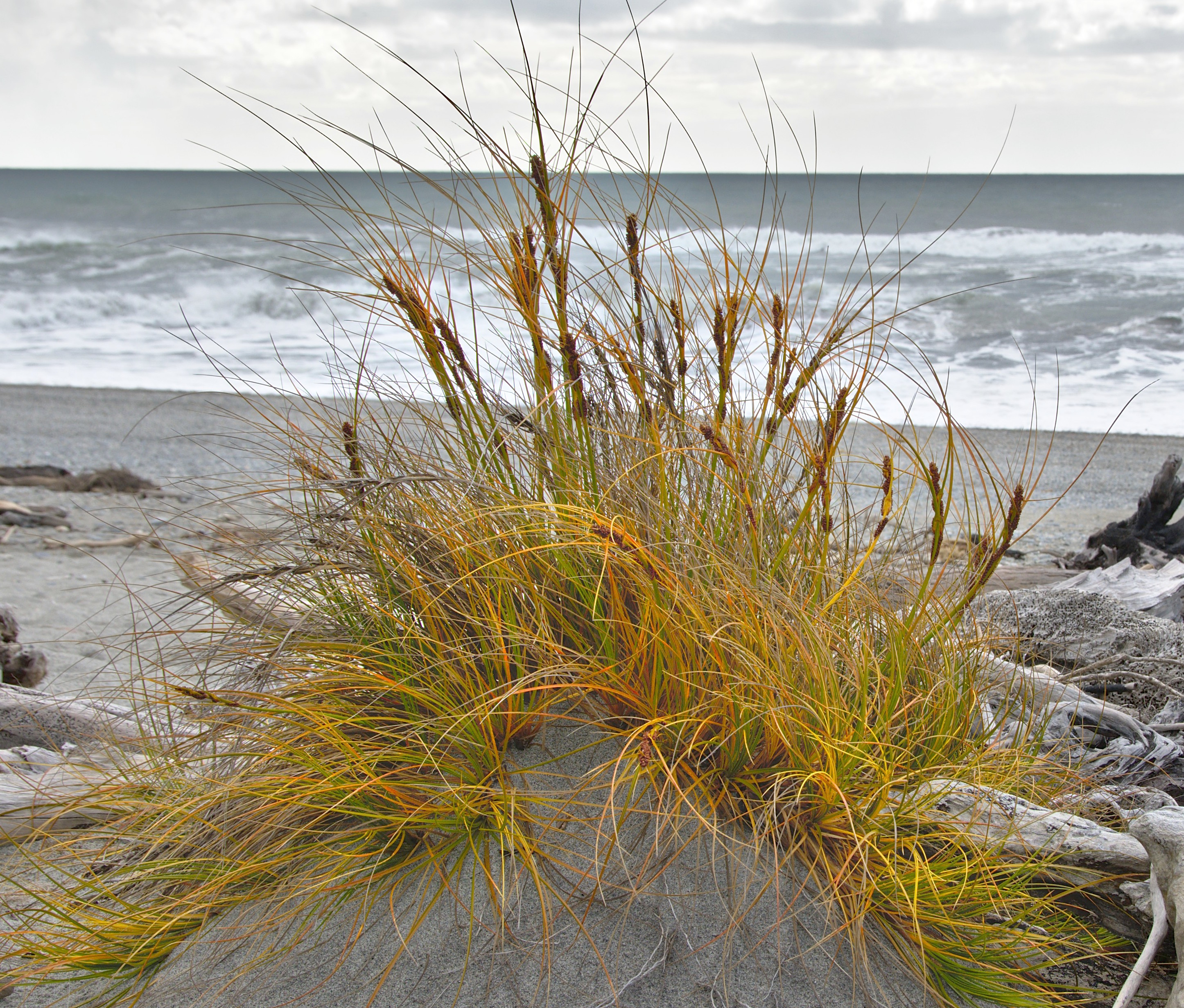
- Pīngao, Tauperikaka Point, West Coast, NZ

Scientific classification
- Kingdom: Plantae
- Clade: Tracheophytes
- Clade: Angiosperms
- Clade: Monocots
- Clade: Commelinids
- Order: Poales
- Family: Cyperaceae
- Genus: Ficinia
- Species: F. spiralis

Binomial name
- Ficinia spiralis (A.Rich) Muasya & de Lange

Synonyms
- Isolepis spiralis A.Rich.; Desmoschoenus spiralis (A.Rich.) Hook.f.; Anthophyllum urvillei Steudel; Scirpus frondosus Boeck; Scirpus spiralis (A.Rich.) Druce

= Ficinia spiralis =

Pīngao

Species of plant in New Zealand

Ficinia spiralis (pīngao, pīkao, or golden sand sedge) is a coastal sedge endemic to New Zealand (including the Chatham Islands). Originally widespread, it has suffered severely from competition with introduced marram grass and animal grazing and now has only a patchy distribution.

== Description ==
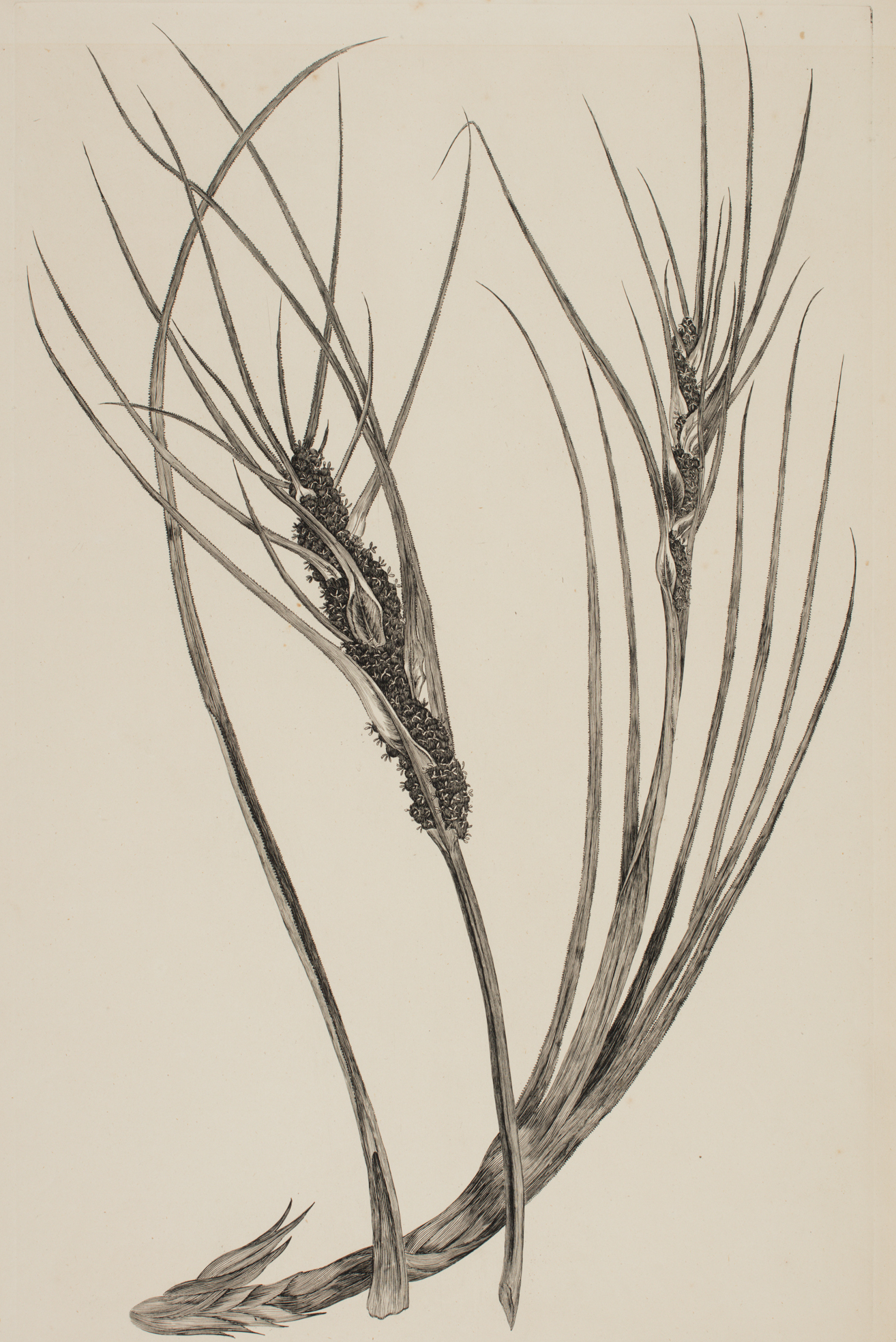
1895 botanical illustration by Sydney Parkinson

Pīngao is a stout, grass-like plant, 30–90 cm (12–35 in) tall, from the sedge family, found on active sand dunes. It is found only in New Zealand and is easily distinguished from other dune species such as spinifex or marram grass. Seen from a distance, pīngao patches have a distinctive orange hue.

Most plants produce long, prostrate, tough rope-like stolons that creep along the sand surface until buried by shifting sand, leaving just the upper portion of leaves exposed. Some southern South Island populations produce dense tussock-like plants without extensive stolons.

Numerous tough, roughly textured leaves are borne in dense tufts on well-spaced, short, upright stems (tillers), along the length of stolons. The narrow leaves are 2–5 mm wide, with colour ranging from bright green when young through golden yellow to a deep orange on mature plants.

Small, dark brown flowers appear in spring and are arranged spirally in tight clusters around the upper 10–30 cm of the upright stem (culm), interspersed with leaf-like bracts. The seeds are shiny, dark brown, egg-shaped, 3–5 mm long, and ripen and fall in early summer. Pīngao can also reproduce vegetatively with its stolons.

== Taxonomy ==
Pīngao was first scientifically described by Achille Richard in 1832, and was given the name Isolepis spiralis. In 1853 Joseph Dalton Hooker placed Pīngao in the genus Desmoschoenus. In 2010 A. M. Muasyaa and Peter de Lange merged the genus Desmoschoenus into Ficinia after their research showed that the two were indistinguishable.

== Etymology ==
The Māori language name pīngao is unique to New Zealand, as there are no known cognates in other Polynesian languages. While the etymology is unknown, the element pī is often used in Māori to refer to tides, and in other Polynesian languages to describe splashing or sprinkling. In the South Island, the plant is known as pīkao in Ngāi Tahu dialect.

The species epithet spiralis likely refers to the seed heads of the plant. The English language name golden sand sedge has become less frequently used in English, as the word pīngao has grown in popularity.

== Range and habitat ==
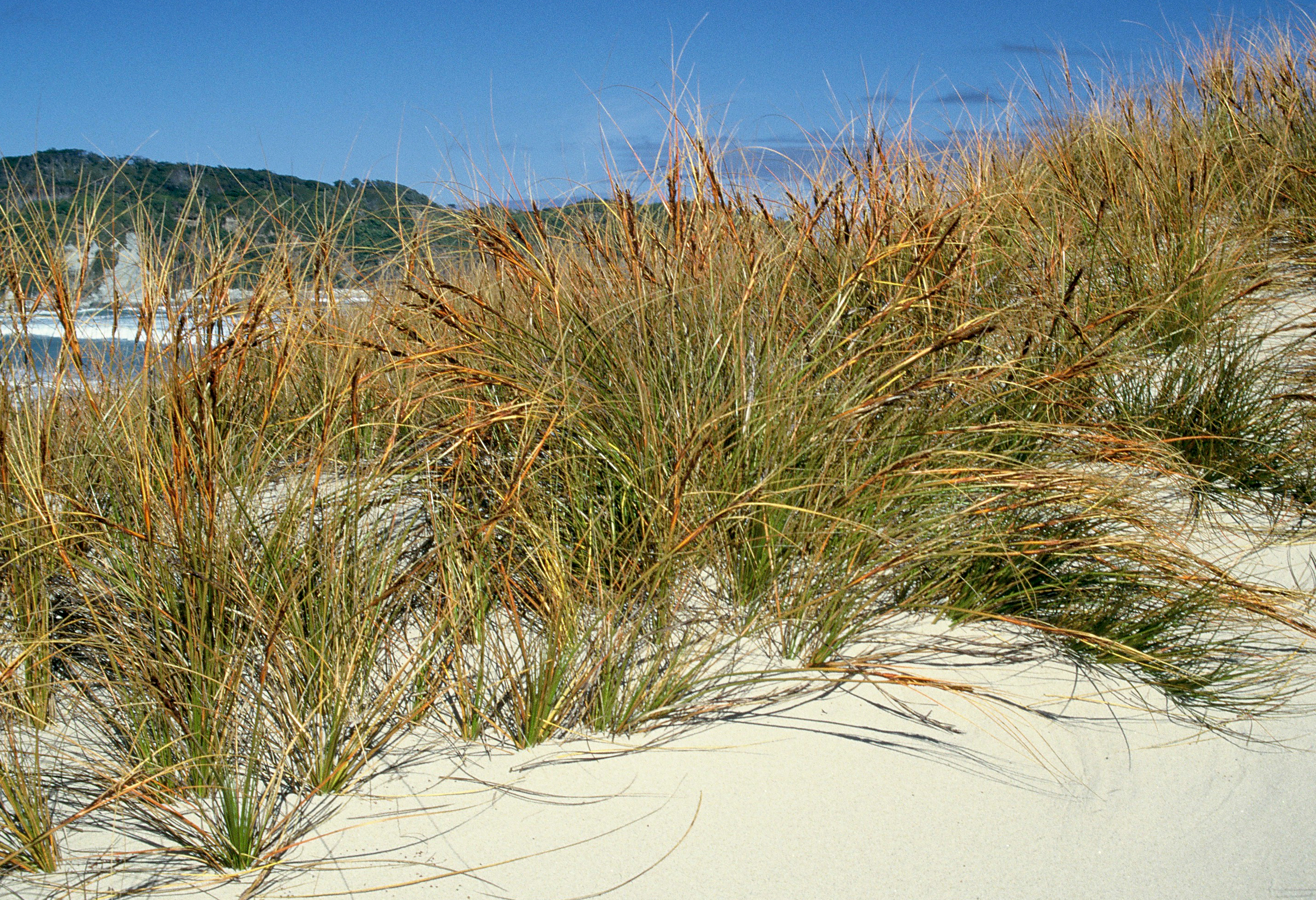
Pīngao growing at Waitutu Beach, Fiordland National Park

The species is endemic to New Zealand, found in sand dunes across mainland New Zealand and the Chatham Islands.

== Ecology ==
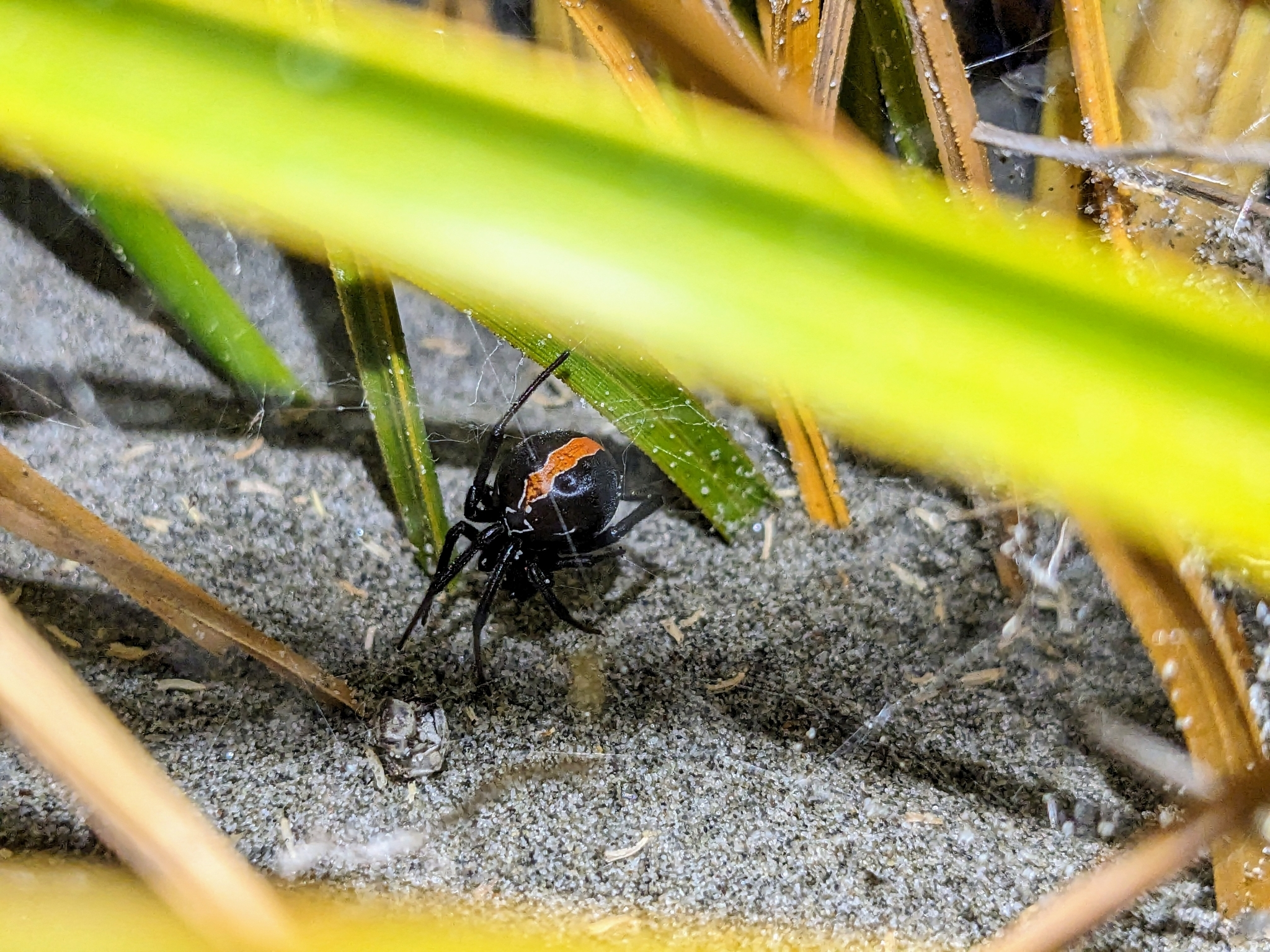
A katipō spider living in pīngao

Pīngao is an important habitat for New Zealand bird and insect species, including the New Zealand pipit, Australasian harrier, New Zealand dotterel and the katipō spider.

== In culture ==
One Māori name for pīngao is ngā tukemata o Tāne, or "Tāne's eyebrows". A pūrākau involving pīngao describes a time of conflict between Tāne Mahuta, God of the Forest, and his brother Takaroa, God of the Sea. Takaroa was jealous of Tāne Mahuta's success in separating Ranginui, the Sky Father, from Papatūānuku, the Earth Mother. Tāne Mahuta tried to end the warring between them and as a sign of peace, Tāne Mahuta plucked out his eyebrows and gave them to Takaroa. Takaroa rejected Tāne's offer and threw the eyebrows back onto the shore, which grow today as pīngao/pīkao. Other pūrākau describe pīngao beginning life as a seaweed and becoming stuck on the shore, after falling in love with the stalks of toetoe, or being placed on land to act as a guardian for the toheroa.

Leaves from pīngao, which turn bright yellow as they dry, are used by Māori in traditional weaving, especially the construction of hats (pōtae), bags (kete), and mats (whāriki). It is also used to create decorative tukutuku panels in a wharenui. The length, width, and strength of the leaves for weaving vary among pīngao populations growing in different areas. Leaves were also used by Māori for thatching. Pīngao is also known to have been fashioned into a traditional armour by Ngāi Tahu.

The tender growing tips of the plant is a traditional Māori food.

== Conservation ==
External videos
- Meet the Locals (Pīngao growing on Turakina Beach)

Prior to European settlement, pīngao was extremely widespread across sand dunes in New Zealand and the Chatham Islands, and has become displaced by introduced species, such as marram and Pinus radiata, and introduced weeds such as yellow tree lupins. Marram and pines create more stable dunes, so during colonisation large areas of pīngao were burnt. It is now restricted to scattered patches around coastal New Zealand, and is actively planted by community groups and the Department of Conservation when restoring native ecosystems.

== Gallery ==
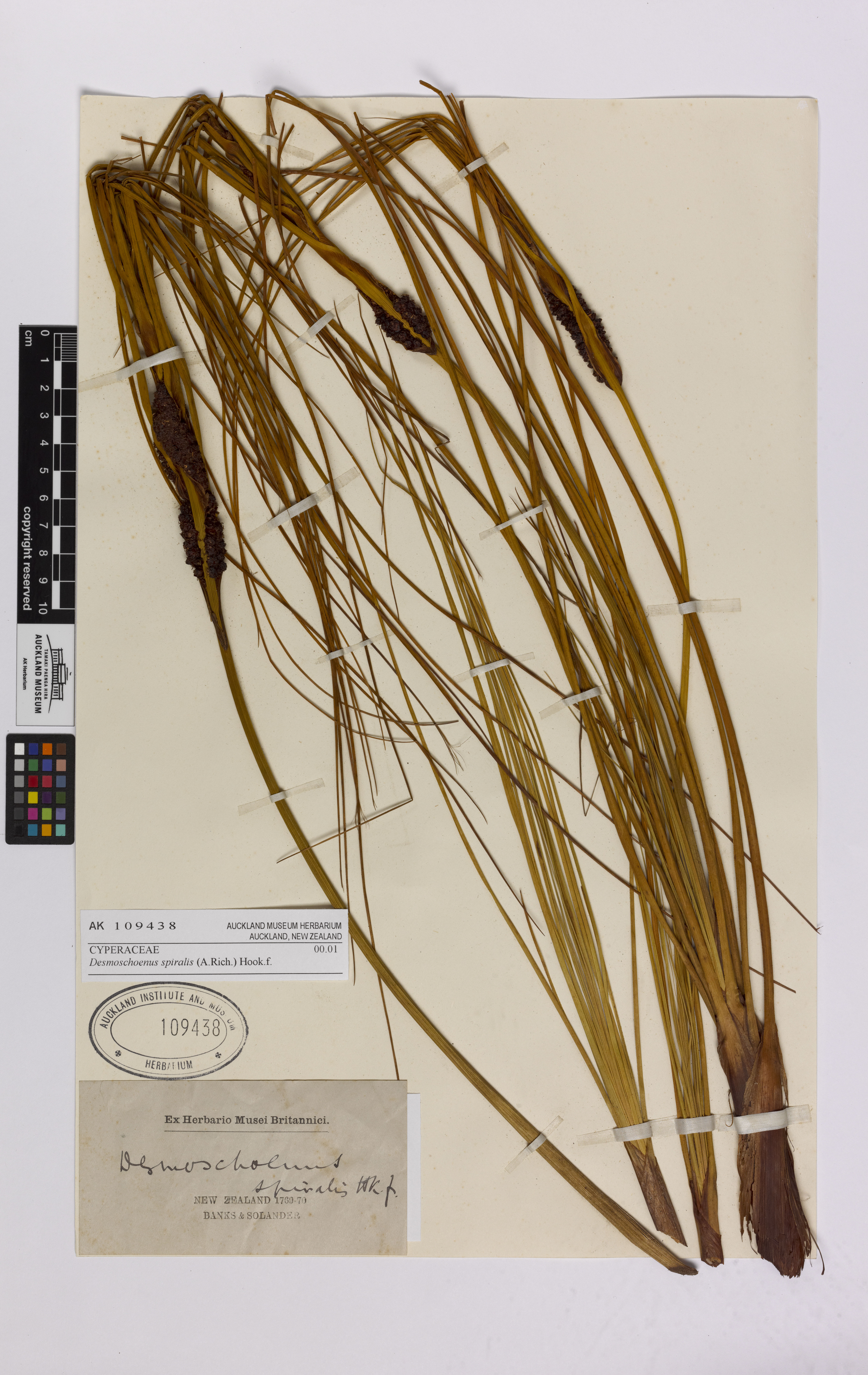
Herbarium specimen

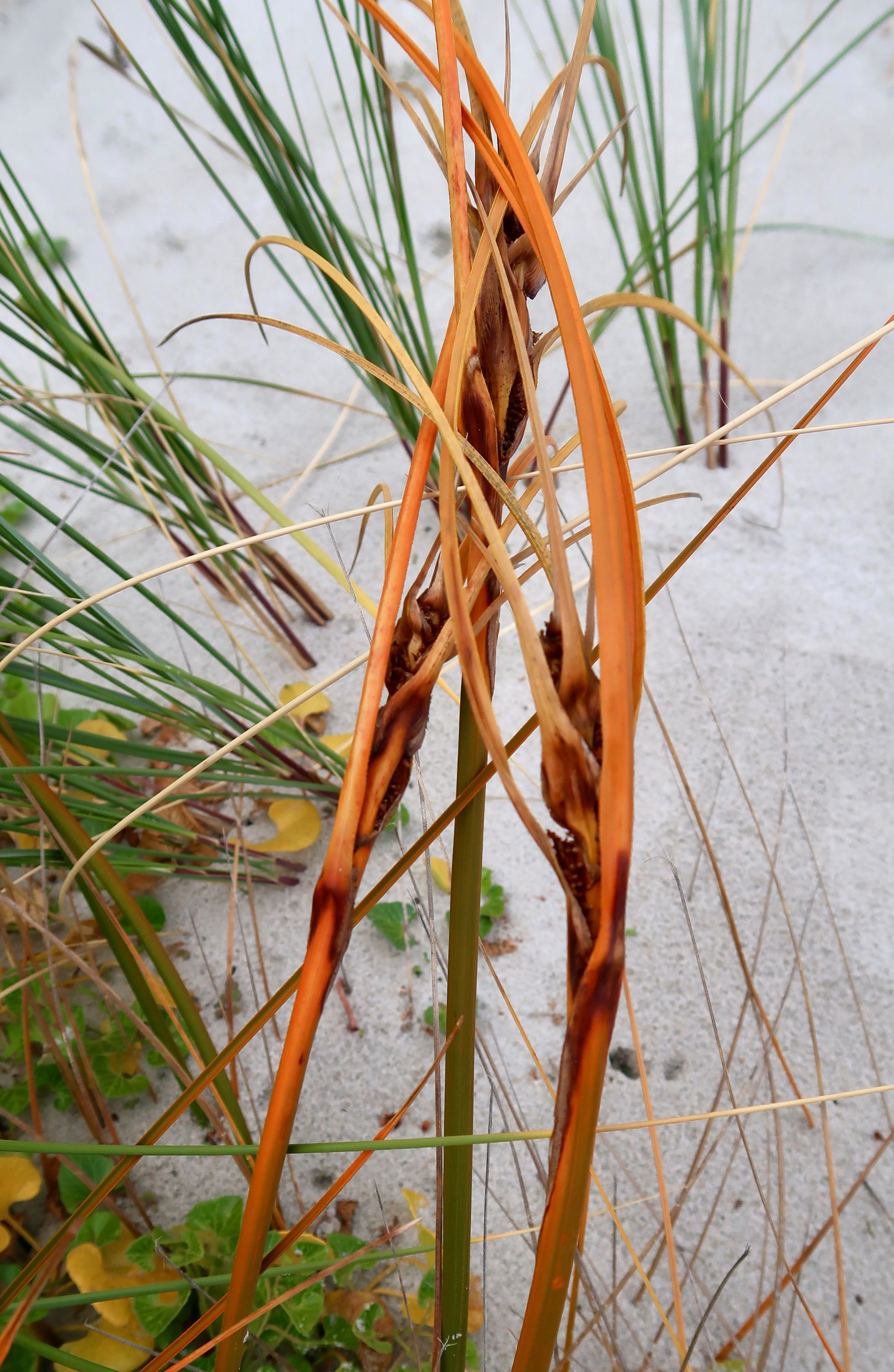
Pīngao seed heads and bracts

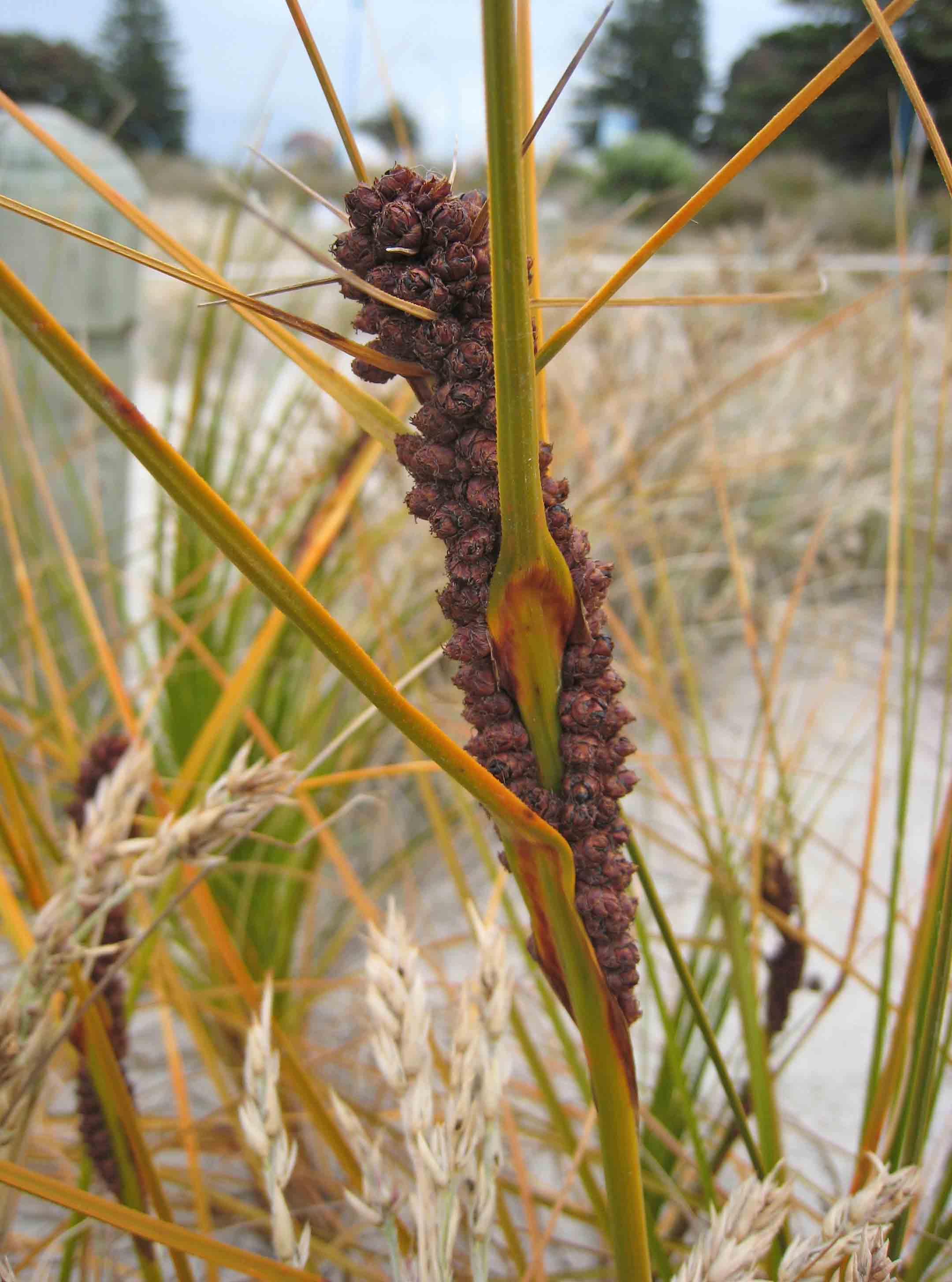
Seed head

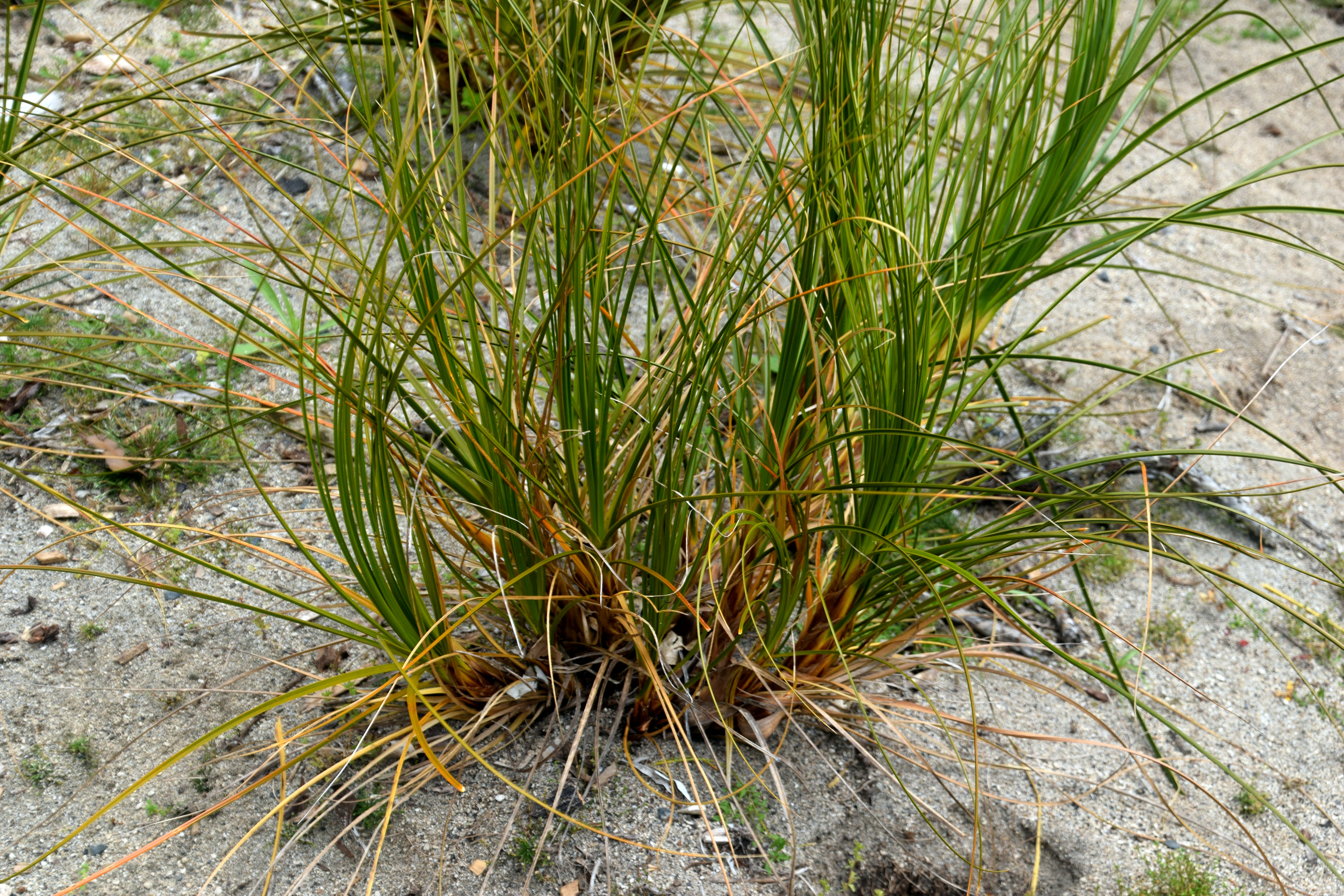
Base of plant
