= John Fraser Griffiths =

South African-British colonial official (died 1971)

Accountant-General
- In office 1955–1968

Official Member of the Legislative Council
- In office 1955–1966

Personal details
- Died: 1971 London, United Kingdom

John Fraser Griffiths OBE (died 1971) was a South African who worked as a British colonial official. As Accountant-General of Fiji between 1955 and 1968, he also served in the Legislative Council.

== Biography ==
Born in what became South Africa, Griffiths worked for Standard Bank between 1930 and 1937. He then joined the Colonial Service. He joined the Royal Air Force during World War II and was badly injured in a crash.

Having worked in Basutoland and Nyasaland, in 1953 he moved to Fiji to become Deputy Accountant-General. Two years later, he was promoted to Accountant-General. As a result of his position, he served in the Legislative Council as an official member. He was made an OBE in the 1965 New Year Honours. The following year he became the first chair of the Fiji National Provident Fund.

Griffiths retired in 1968 and died in London in 1971.
