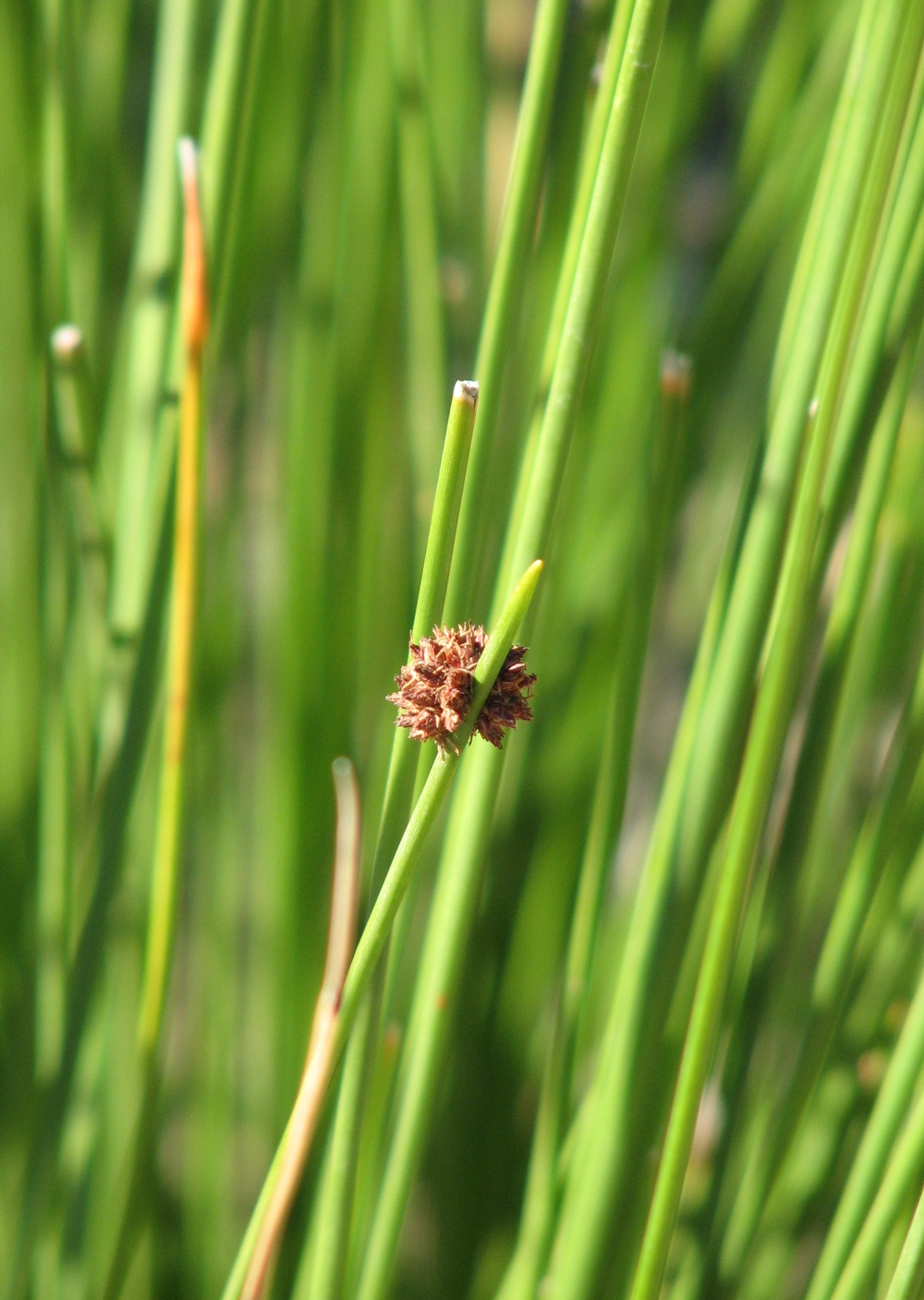
- Ficinia nodosa

Scientific classification
- Kingdom: Plantae
- Clade: Tracheophytes
- Clade: Angiosperms
- Clade: Monocots
- Clade: Commelinids
- Order: Poales
- Family: Cyperaceae
- Genus: Ficinia; Schrad.

Synonyms
- Acrolepis Schrad.; Anthophyllum Steud.; Chamaexiphium Hochst. ex Steud.; Desmoschoenus Hook.f.; Hemichlaena Schrad.; Hypolepis P.Beauv. ex Lestib.; Hypophialium Nees; Melancranis Vahl; Pleurachne Schrad.; Schoenidium Nees; Sickmannia Nees

= Ficinia =

Genus of grass-like plants

Ficinia is a genus of tufted or rhizomatous sedges in the family Cyperaceae. There are 91 accepted species – around 70 recognised species in Africa, four species (Ficinia ambigua, Ficinia anomala, Ficinia nodosa, and Ficinia spiralis) that occur in New Zealand and a single species Ficinia nodosa that occurs in Australia. The genus was described by German botanist Heinrich Adolph Schrader after another German botanist, Heinrich David August Ficinus.

== Species ==
91 species are accepted.

- Ficinia acrostachys (Steud.) C.B.Clarke
- Ficinia acuminata (Nees) Nees
- Ficinia albicans Nees
- Ficinia anceps Nees
- Ficinia angustifolia (Schrad.) C.B.Clarke
- Ficinia anysbergensis Muasya
- Ficinia arenicola T.H.Arnold & Gordon-Gray
- Ficinia argyropus Nees
- Ficinia arnoldii Tshiila & Muasya
- Ficinia atrostachya H.Pfeiff.
- Ficinia bolusiana Muasya & C.H.Stirt.
- Ficinia borealis Lye
- Ficinia brevifolia Nees ex Kunth
- Ficinia bulbosa (L.) Nees
- Ficinia capillifolia (Schrad.) C.B.Clarke
- Ficinia capitella (Thunb.) Nees
- Ficinia cedarbergensis T.H.Arnold & Gordon-Gray
- Ficinia ciliata Boeckeler
- Ficinia cinnamomea C.B.Clarke
- Ficinia compasbergensis Drège ex Steud.
- Ficinia crinita (Poir.) B.L Burtt
- Ficinia dasystachys C.B.Clarke
- Ficinia deusta (P.J.Bergius) Levyns
- Ficinia distans C.B.Clarke
- Ficinia dunensis Levyns
- Ficinia dura Turrill
- Ficinia echinata Muasya
- Ficinia ecklonea (Steud.) Nees
- Ficinia elatior Levyns
- Ficinia eligulata Gordon-Gray ex Muasya
- Ficinia esterhuyseniae Muasya
- Ficinia fascicularis Nees
- Ficinia fastigiata (Thunb.) Nees
- Ficinia filiculmea B.L.Burtt
- Ficinia filiformis (Lam.) Schrad.
- Ficinia gracilis Schrad.
- Ficinia grandiflora T.H.Arnold & Gordon-Gray
- Ficinia gydomontana T.H.Arnold & Gordon-Gray
- Ficinia hemiuncialis (C.B.Clarke) Muasya
- Ficinia incomtula (Nees) Muasya
- Ficinia indica (Lam.) H.Pfeiff.
- Ficinia involuta Nees
- Ficinia ixioides Nees
- Ficinia jardinei Muasya & C.H.Stirt.
- Ficinia laciniata (Thunb.) Nees
- Ficinia laevis Nees
- Ficinia lateralis (Vahl) Kunth
- Ficinia latifolia T.H.Arnold & Gordon-Gray
- Ficinia leiocarpa Nees
- Ficinia leucoloma (Nees) Muasya
- Ficinia levynsiae T.H.Arnold & Gordon-Gray
- Ficinia limosa Levyns
- Ficinia × lucida C.B.Clarke
- Ficinia macowanii C.B.Clarke
- Ficinia micrantha C.B.Clarke
- Ficinia minuta (Turrill) Muasya
- Ficinia minutiflora C.B.Clarke
- Ficinia montana Tshiila & Muasya
- Ficinia monticola Kunth
- Ficinia mucronata C.B.Clarke
- Ficinia nana B.L.Burtt
- Ficinia neocapensis Muasya
- Ficinia nigrescens (Schrad.) J.Raynal
- Ficinia nodosa (Rottb.) Goetgh., Muasya & D.A.Simpson
- Ficinia oligantha (Steud.) J.Raynal
- Ficinia overbergensis Muasya & C.H.Stirt.
- Ficinia pallens (Schrad.) Nees
- Ficinia paradoxa (Schrad.) Nees
- Ficinia petrophylla T.H.Arnold & Gordon-Gray
- Ficinia pinguior C.B.Clarke
- Ficinia polystachya Levyns
- Ficinia praemorsa Nees
- Ficinia pusilla C.B.Clarke
- Ficinia pygmaea Boeckeler
- Ficinia quartzicola Muasya & Helme
- Ficinia quinquangularis Boeckeler
- Ficinia radiata (L.f.) Kunth
- Ficinia ramosissima Kunth
- Ficinia repens Kunth
- Ficinia rigida Levyns
- Ficinia secunda (Vahl) Kunth
- Ficinia spiralis (A.Rich.) Muasya & de Lange
- Ficinia stirtonii Muasya
- Ficinia stolonifera Boeckeler
- Ficinia swartruggensis Muasya & C.H.Stirt.
- Ficinia trichodes (Schrad.) B.D.Jacks.
- Ficinia trispicata (L.f.) Druce
- Ficinia tristachya (Rottb.) Nees
- Ficinia trollii (Kük.) Muasya & D.A.Simpson
- Ficinia truncata (Thunb.) Schrad.
- Ficinia undosa B.L.Burtt
- Ficinia zeyheri Boeckeler
