= John O. Griffiths =

British philatelist

John O. Griffiths

John Oliver Griffiths (15 July 1923 – 13 April 2001) was a British philatelist who was added to the Roll of Distinguished Philatelists in 1987.

Griffiths won the Grand Prix d'Honneur plus Large Gold medal at STOCKHOLMIA 74 for his British stamps. He won Large Gold plus Grand Prix d'Honneur at BANGKOK 83 for South Australia and later won gold medals for Leeward Islands in the 1980s.

Griffiths married Lynne Griffiths (1923–1990).
