= John Griffiths (cricketer, born 1863) =

English cricketer

John Griffiths (born 27 January 1863, date of death unknown) was an English cricketer who played for Nottinghamshire. He was born in Long Eaton, Derbyshire.

Griffiths made a single first-class appearance for the side during the 1891 season, though he did not bat or bowl in the match and took no catches in the field.
