= John Griffiths (footballer, born 1876) =

English footballer

Personal information
- Full name: John Edward Griffiths
- Date of birth: 10 April 1876
- Place of birth: Aston, England
- Date of death: 24 September 1953 (aged 76–77)
- Place of death: Hastings, England
- Position: Wing half

Senior career*
Years	Team	Apps	(Gls)
1891–1894	Soho Villa		
1894–1895	Halesowen		
1895–1898	Aston Villa	0	(0)
1898–1903	Grimsby Town	85	(5)
1903–1904	Northampton Town		
1906–1909	Hastings & St Leonards United		
- * Club domestic league appearances and goals

John Edward Griffiths (10 April 1876 – 24 September 1953) was an English professional footballer who played as a wing half.
