= Port Fairy =

- Town
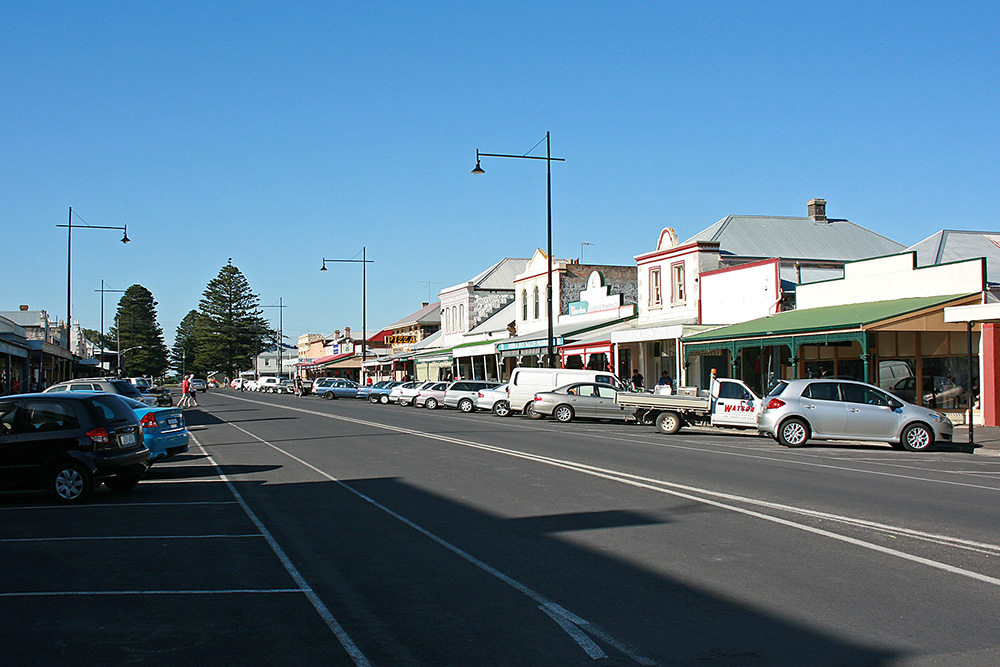
- West side of main shopping precinct, looking south

- Coordinates: 38°22′0″S 142°14′0″E
- Country: Australia
- State: Victoria
- LGA: Shire of Moyne
- Location: 293 km (182 mi) W of Melbourne; 75 km (47 mi) E of Portland; 29 km (18 mi) W of Warrnambool
- Established: 1843

Government
  - State electorate: South-West Coast
  - Federal division: Wannon
- Elevation: 6 m (20 ft)

Population
  - Total: 3,340 (2016 census)
- Postcode: 3284
- Mean max temp: 18.6 °C (65.5 °F)
- Mean min temp: 9.5 °C (49.1 °F)
- Annual rainfall: 770.1 mm (30.32 in)

Port Fairy (historically known as Belfast) is a town in south-western Victoria, Australia. It lies on the Princes Highway in the Shire of Moyne, 28 kilometres (17 mi) west of Warrnambool and 290 kilometres (180 mi) west of Melbourne, at the point where the Moyne River enters the Southern Ocean.

== History ==
Prior to British colonisation in the 19th century, the Port Fairy area, then known as Pyipkil or Ummut, was inhabited by the Pyipkil gunditj clan, also known as the Yarrer gunditj. They spoke the Peek Whurrong language. The region's ecology consisted of dense Banksia-dominated bushland and large swamps. The Pyipkil gunditj constructed stone and timber fishing-weirs called yereroc across creeks to catch fish and eels. They also cut canals called vam to drain swamps and made woven eel-pots called arabine to trap eels. The Eastern Maar people are recognised as the traditional owners of the Port Fairy area.

In the early 19th century whalers and seal hunters used the coast in this region. The crew of the sealing cutter The Fairy (Captain James Wishart) reportedly gave the bay its current name in 1828. Whatever its origins, the name "Port Fairy" had come into general use by 1835.

John Griffiths established a whaling station in 1835, and a store opened in 1839. The post office opened in 1843 as "Port Fairy". Also in 1843, James Atkinson, a Sydney solicitor, purchased land in the town by special survey. He drained the swamps, subdivided and leased the land, and built a harbour on the Moyne River. He named the town "Belfast" after his hometown in Ireland. Construction of a mechanics' institute on one of Atkinson's plots (today 65 Sackville Street), began in 1865, with the building completed in 1871.

In the 1840s significant conflict between pastoral squatters and Aboriginal people occurred. In 1842, 27 squatters from the Port Fairy neighbourhood signed a letter to Charles Latrobe, the Superintendent of the Port Phillip District, reporting many "outrages" committed by the "natives" and requesting the government provide security. These clashes, later known as the Eumeralla Wars, formed part of the battle over land use and resources between traditional owners and Europeans across the Victoria's western district.

The post office was renamed "Belfast" on 1 January 1854 before reverting to the original name on 20 July 1887 as a result of an Act of Parliament.

Agriculture developed in the region, and Belfast became an important transport hub. By 1857 the town had a population of 2,190.

A railway extended to the town in 1890, but closed in 1977. It has been converted into the Port Fairy to Warrnambool Rail Trail.

The Port Fairy Magistrates' Court closed on 1 January 1990.

== Traditional ownership ==
The formally recognised traditional owners for the area in which Port Fairy sits are the Eastern Maar people, who are represented by the Eastern Maar Aboriginal Corporation (EMAC).

== Town ==
At the 2016 census, Port Fairy had a population of 3,340. Its main industries are tourism and fishing, and it is the home port for one of Victoria's largest fishing fleets. A pharmaceutical factory owned by Sun Pharma is located on the outskirts of the town. Port Fairy has two primary schools: the Port Fairy Consolidated School and St. Patricks Parish Primary School.

Port Fairy was voted as one of the world's most livable cities with a population under 20,000 after winning the 2012 International LivCom award.

Port Fairy has a rich history, and 50 buildings are protected by the National Trust of Australia. Griffiths Island nearby holds a breeding colony of the short-tailed shearwater or Australian muttonbird.

== Gallery ==
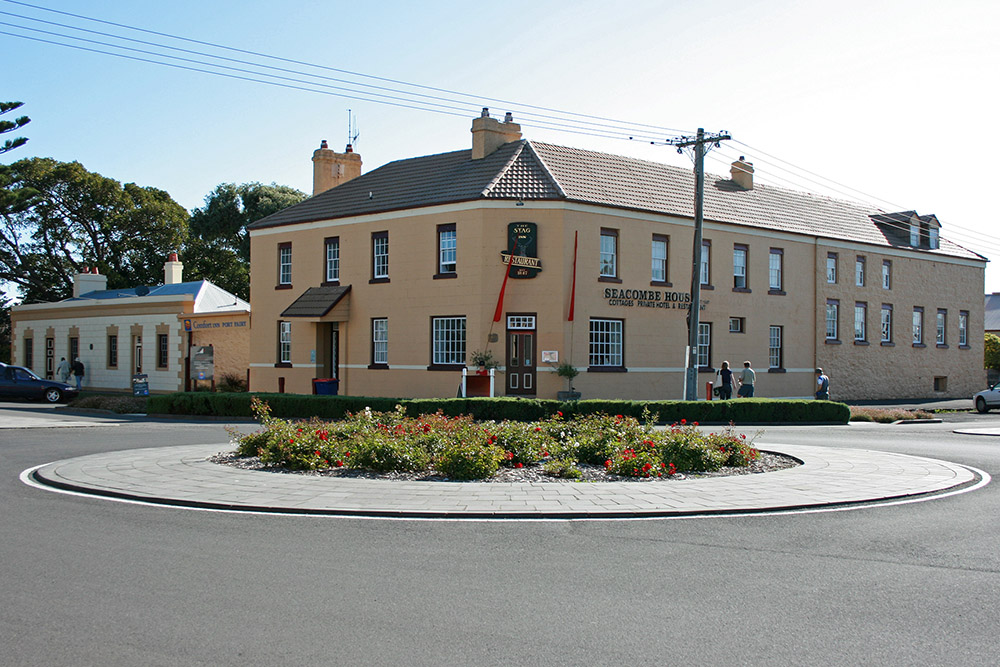
The Stag Inn, currently the Seacombe House hotel, built in 1847 by Captain John Sanders, remains little changed externally from the time it opened.

West side of Sackville Street, looking north

Lecture Hall and Library, Sackville Street

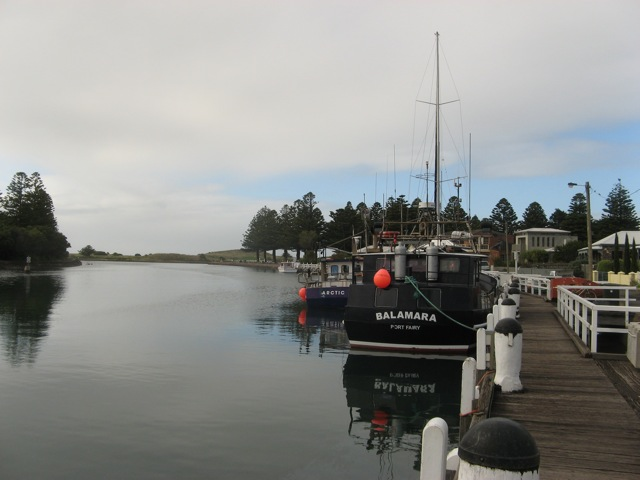
The harbour on the Moyne River

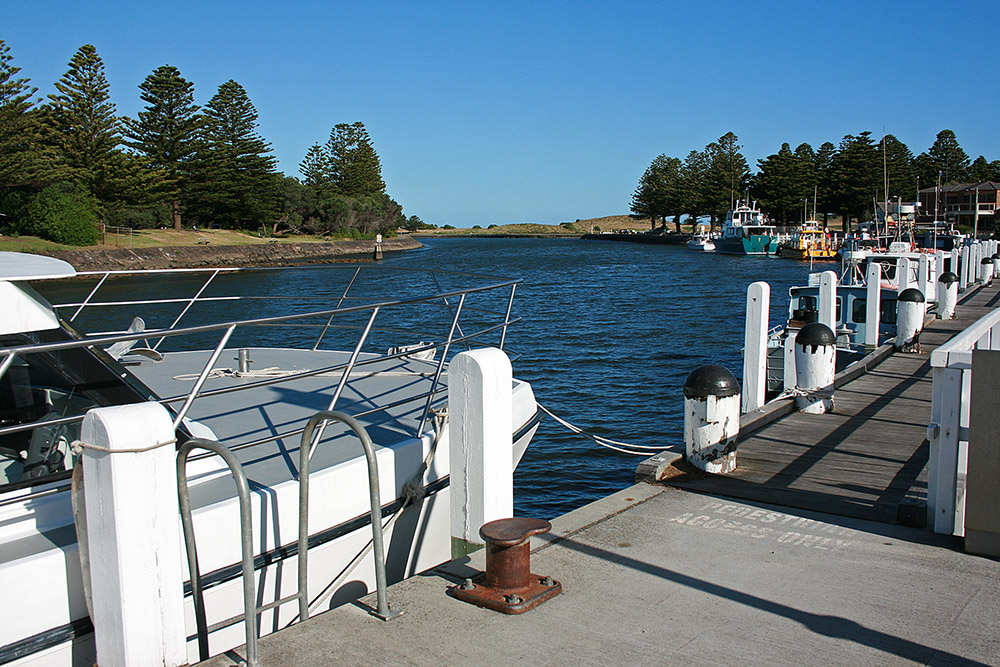
Moyne River, Port Fairy

Moyne River, looking north

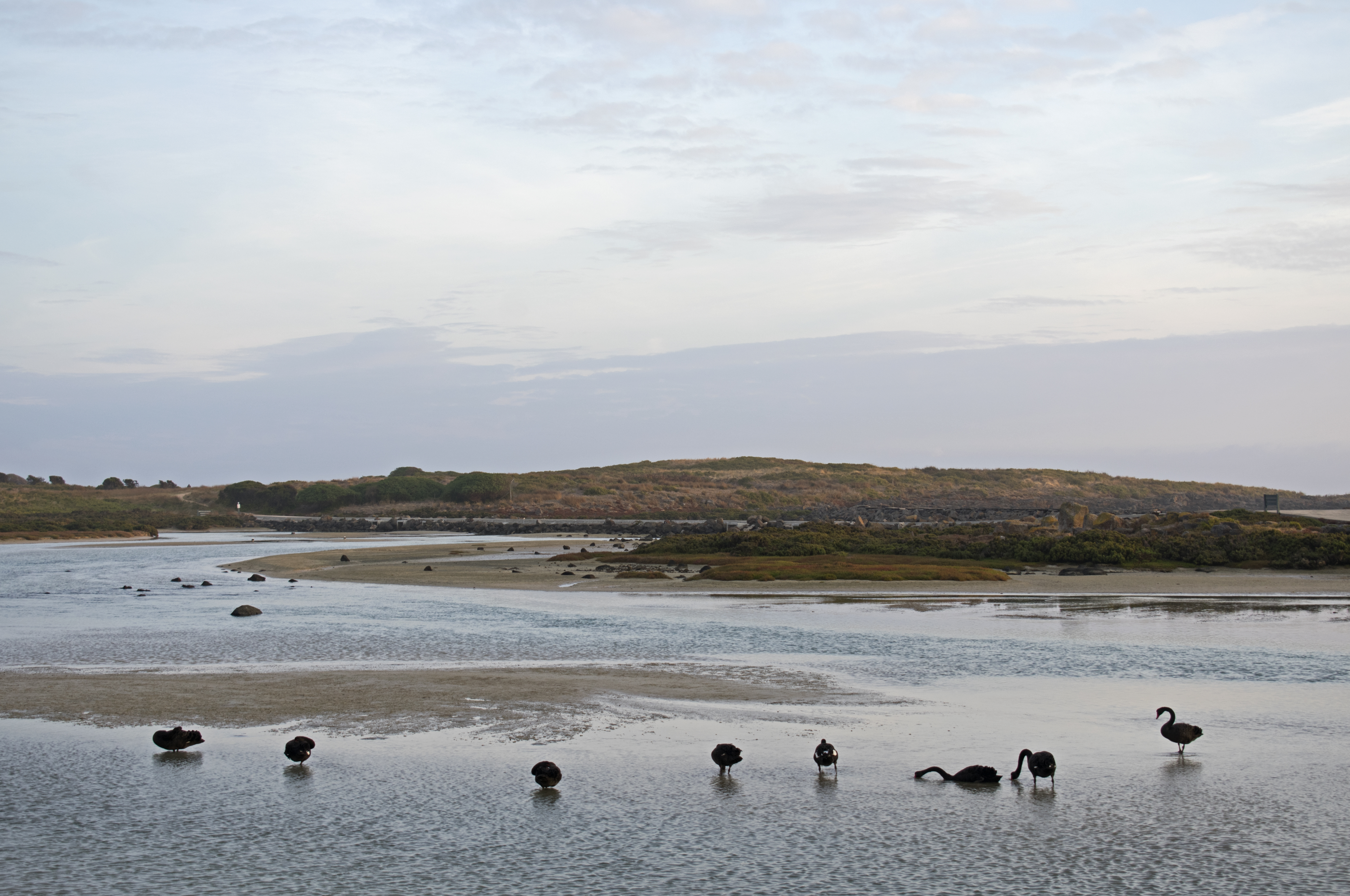
Griffiths Island with black swans at the foreground

== Festivals ==
The Port Fairy Folk Festival is held during the Labour Day long weekend in March each year. The festival has run continuously since 1977. In 2016, Port Fairy celebrated the 40th edition of the Folk Festival from 11 to 14 March. Over the 40 festivals there have been around 3,500 acts including over 500 international acts and over 12,000 musicians to an audience of beyond 240,000 ticket holders and 1,000,000 attendees.

The inaugural Port Fairy Spring Music Festival was held in 1990, founded by British/Australian composer Michael Easton and pianist Len Vorster, and is run annually. The open-air festival, which is free to attend, focuses on classical and contemporary ensemble music, and also includes drama, orchestral and choral music, jazz, opera, and dance. Its past artistic directors have included Vorster, Marco van Pagee (who also founded the Melbourne International Chamber Music Competition in 1991 and was in 2009 artistic director of Chamber Music Australia), Erich Fackert, Stephen McIntyre, Anna Goldsworthy and Iain Grandage. As of 2023 its program includes 24 performances over three days, and the artistic directors are Monica Curro and Stefan Cassomenos.

The annual Moyneyana Festival is held over summer from Christmas Eve to 26 January.

The annual Tarerer Festival, taking place over a weekend, is a celebration of the region's multicultural identity, its history relating to its Aboriginal peoples (Koori, in particular those of the Warrnambool district), and the environmental significance of the land. It features music and dance as well as art and performance workshops, and includes music from a variety of cultures, including non-Indigenous ones. Begun in 1996 by a group of people in Framlingham Forest, it is the only festival of its kind in Victoria. The name derives from the Aboriginal name for Tower Hill, the nearby area of volcanic lakes. In 2008, it featured the rock reggae band of the 1980s, No Fixed Address, as well as a Sudanese band.

== Sports and recreation ==
Port Fairy also has a highly rated 18-hole links golf course, the Port Fairy Golf Club, situated on Woodbine Road.

The town has an Australian rules football team, the Port Fairy Seagulls, which plays in the Hampden Football League.

Port Fairy has many surfing spots for all skill levels including the Old Passage, a right hand rocky break at the old entrance to the Moyne river; the Lighthouse, a right-hand point break off Griffiths island; and the East Beach with many right and left beach breaks.

== Notable people ==
- Sir Frank Macfarlane Burnet (1899–1985), Nobel Prize-winning virologist, died in Port Fairy
- John Coleman (1928–1973), Australian rules footballer
- Brian Dunlop (1938–2009), painter
- Denis Napthine, Premier of Victoria 2013–2014
- T. J. Ryan, Premier of Queensland 1915–1919
- Jock Serong, writer

== Climate ==
Climate data for Port Fairy (1991–2020 normals, extremes 1990–present)
| Month | Jan | Feb | Mar | Apr | May | Jun | Jul | Aug | Sep | Oct | Nov | Dec | Year |
|---|---|---|---|---|---|---|---|---|---|---|---|---|---|
| Record high °C (°F) | 44.3 (111.7) | 42.1 (107.8) | 41.3 (106.3) | 36.1 (97.0) | 28.7 (83.7) | 23.2 (73.8) | 20.9 (69.6) | 25.2 (77.4) | 31.3 (88.3) | 35.7 (96.3) | 38.5 (101.3) | 45.2 (113.4) | 45.2 (113.4) |
| Mean daily maximum °C (°F) | 22.7 (72.9) | 22.8 (73.0) | 21.6 (70.9) | 19.4 (66.9) | 16.8 (62.2) | 14.7 (58.5) | 14.2 (57.6) | 15.0 (59.0) | 16.6 (61.9) | 18.3 (64.9) | 20.0 (68.0) | 21.3 (70.3) | 18.6 (65.5) |
| Mean daily minimum °C (°F) | 14.1 (57.4) | 14.6 (58.3) | 13.1 (55.6) | 10.9 (51.6) | 9.2 (48.6) | 7.5 (45.5) | 6.9 (44.4) | 7.3 (45.1) | 8.3 (46.9) | 9.4 (48.9) | 11.2 (52.2) | 12.6 (54.7) | 10.4 (50.7) |
| Record low °C (°F) | 4.6 (40.3) | 5.6 (42.1) | 5.3 (41.5) | 0.3 (32.5) | 0.4 (32.7) | −1.3 (29.7) | −1.0 (30.2) | 0.1 (32.2) | 0.4 (32.7) | 1.4 (34.5) | 2.7 (36.9) | 3.4 (38.1) | −1.3 (29.7) |
| Average rainfall mm (inches) | 30.3 (1.19) | 28.6 (1.13) | 36.9 (1.45) | 49.7 (1.96) | 69.6 (2.74) | 75.1 (2.96) | 88.8 (3.50) | 87.6 (3.45) | 69.1 (2.72) | 53.4 (2.10) | 45.5 (1.79) | 41.5 (1.63) | 678.6 (26.72) |
| Average rainy days (≥ 1.0 mm) | 4.2 | 3.6 | 6.2 | 8.1 | 11.6 | 12.0 | 14.7 | 14.9 | 11.6 | 9.2 | 6.7 | 5.9 | 108.7 |
Source: Australian Bureau of Meteorology (rain 1994-2020)
