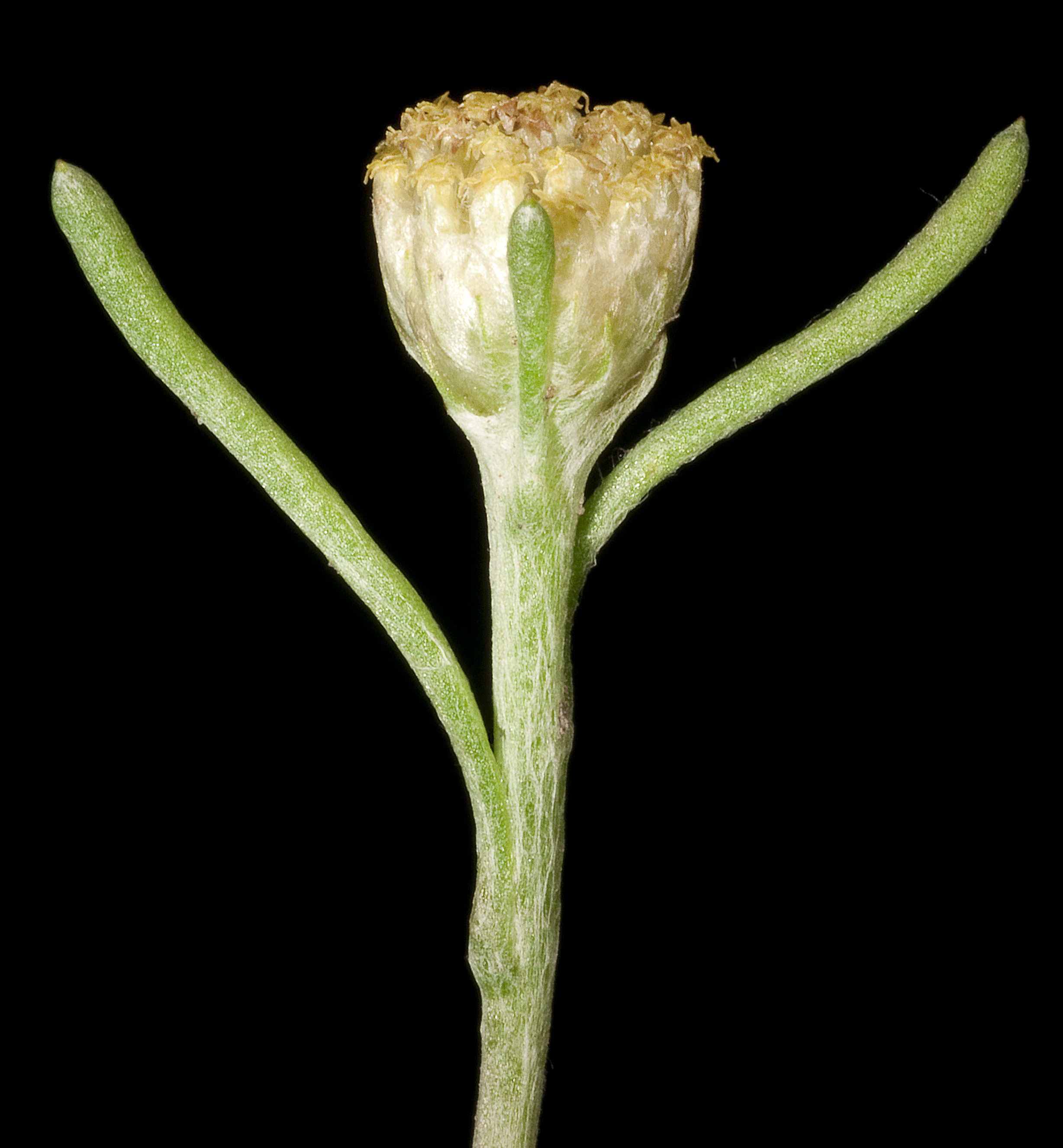

Scientific classification
- Kingdom: Plantae
- Clade: Tracheophytes
- Clade: Angiosperms
- Clade: Eudicots
- Clade: Asterids
- Order: Asterales
- Family: Asteraceae
- Subfamily: Asteroideae
- Tribe: Gnaphalieae
- Genus: Blennospora; A.Gray

Type species
- Blennospora drummondii A.Gray

Species
- 3

= Blennospora =

Genus of flowering plants

Blennospora is a genus of flowering plants in the aster family, Asteraceae. There are three species, all endemic to Australia. The genus was first described by Asa Gray in 1851, with the generic name from the Greek, βλέννη (mucus), and σπόρων (seed)

"allud(ing) to the cellular pellicle of the achaenium becoming gelatinous when moistened, as in Cephalosoriis phyllocepkalus, but even more strikingly. This pellicle consists of a close coating of linear or subclavate diaphanous cells, compactly arranged with their long diameter perpendicular to the smooth brown pericarp: on the application of water it promptly swells into a mass of transparent jelly, very much thicker than the enclosed achsenium. The gorged mucous cells remain unbroken for a considerable time, and their extremely delicate walls show no markings, nor any contained coiled bands or fibres."

Species:

- Blennospora doliiformis (Western Australia)
- Blennospora drummondii (Western Australia, South Australia, Victoria)
- Blennospora phlegmatocarpa (Western Australia)
