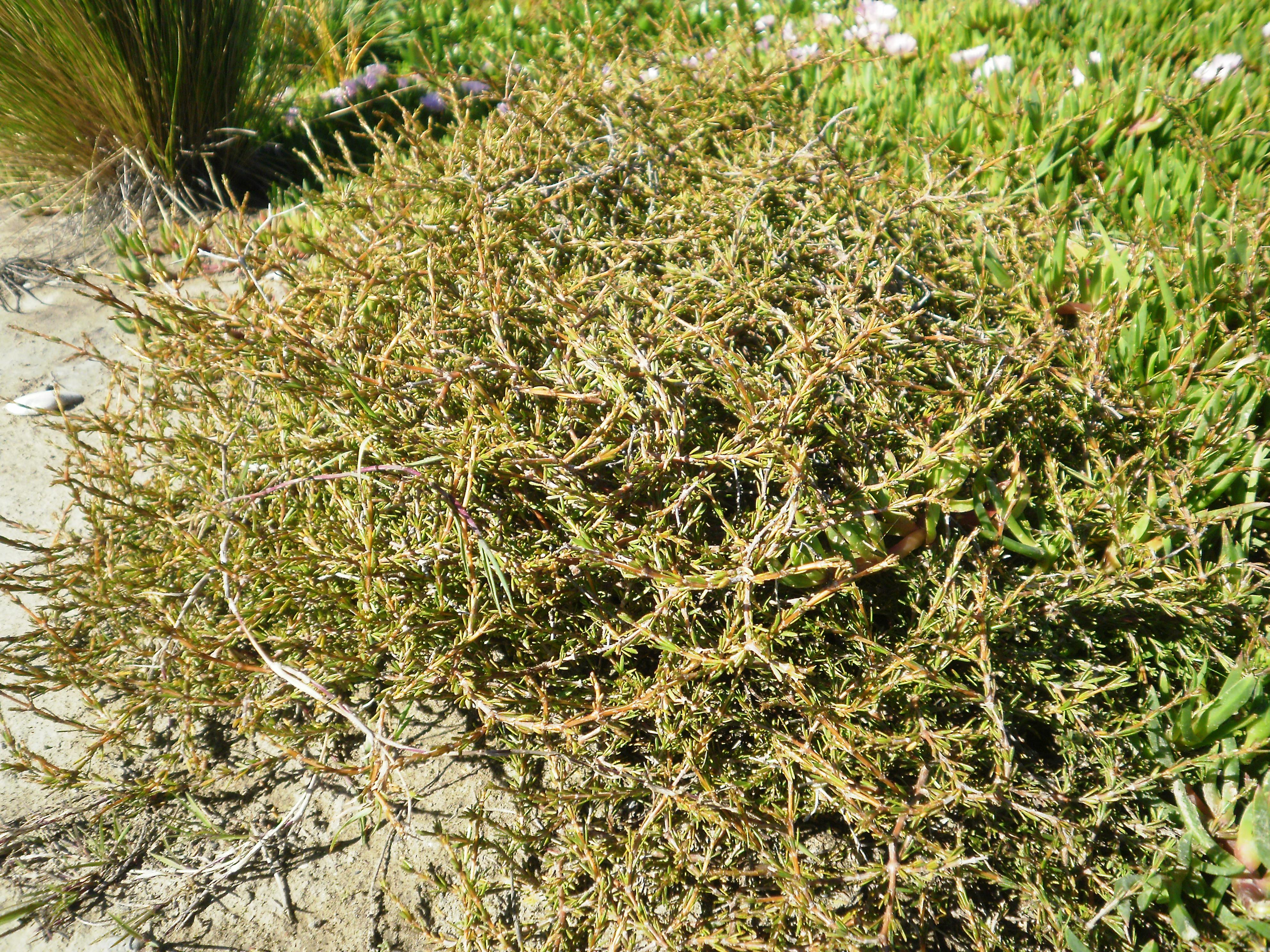

Conservation status
- Declining (NZ TCS)

Scientific classification
- Kingdom: Plantae
- Clade: Tracheophytes
- Clade: Angiosperms
- Clade: Eudicots
- Clade: Asterids
- Order: Gentianales
- Family: Rubiaceae
- Genus: Coprosma
- Species: C. acerosa

Binomial name
- Coprosma acerosa A.Cunn.

= Coprosma acerosa =

Species of plant

Coprosma acerosa, commonly called sand coprosma, or tātaraheke, is a shrub that is endemic to New Zealand. It is a coastal plant found in sandy habitats. C. acerosa is a low, spreading shrub with yellow-brownish branches, yellow-green and leathery leaves, and pale blue fruit. It is listed as At Risk - Declining in the New Zealand Threat Classification for vascular plants, as the species is in decline over large parts of its original range due to competition from marram grass and other threats.

== Description ==
Berries of plant

Low-growing mass of flexible, interlacing yellowish-brown branches forming a cushion-like shrub about 2 m wide. Leaves are opposite, leathery, yellowish-green, linear obtuse, about 1 cm long by 1.5 cm wide. Flowers solitary with a funnelform corolla, and either male or female. Male flowers are lacking a calyx and the corolla lobes are ovate-oblong and subacute. Female flowers have an obvious calyx and the corolla lobes are narrow-oblong and obtuse. The fruit is a spherical drupe that is translucent, pale blue, and about 7 mm in diameter.

== Taxonomy ==
Coprosma acerosa is a species in the family Rubiaceae. It was originally described by English botanist Allan Cunningham in 1838, based on Swedish botanist Daniel Solander's unpublished description and English botanist Joseph Banks' North Island collections from the first voyage of James Cook. Its common name is sand coprosma, or tātaraheke in te reo Māori.

== Distribution and habitat ==
Coprosma acerosa is endemic to New Zealand. It is found on coastal sands throughout the North Island, South Island, Stewart Island and Chatham Islands.

== Ecology ==
The New Zealand dotterel has been observed eating the fruits of C. acerosa in Mason Bay, Stewart Island.

== Conservation status and threats ==
The species is listed as At Risk - Declining in the most recent assessment (2023) of the New Zealand Threatened Classification for plants. This status has not changed from the previous two assessments.

In addition to the qualifiers PD ("Partial decline"), C. acerosa also has the qualifier CI ("Climate impact"). The CI qualifier has been used by the Department of Conservation since 2021 to flag species in its conservation assessments that are "adversely affected by long-term climate trends and/or extreme climatic events."

Marram grass, dune reclamation, browsing by rabbits and hares, damage by 4WD vehicles and trampling by humans are all threats to C. acerosa.
