= Jonathan Griffiths (shipowner) =

English-born Australian convict, shipowner, and builder

- Born: May 1773; England
- Died: November 1839 (aged 66); Port Fairy, Victoria, Australia
- Occupation: Shipsman

Jonathan Griffiths (1773–1839) was an English-born Australian convict, shipowner and builder. He was born in Britain in 1773 to Thomas Griffiths and his wife Sarah née' Withers. He was 15 years of age when found guilty of grand larceny and sentenced to 7 years transportation. He reached Port Jackson in August 1790.

He later became known as a shipbuilder, shipowner and whaler in Launceston, Tasmania.
