= John Griffiths (shipowner) =

Australian shipowner (1801–1881)

- Born: August 23, 1801; Richmond, Colony of New South Wales
- Died: January 2, 1881 (aged 79); Launceston, Tasmania, Australia

John Griffiths (1801–1881) was an Australian shipowner and builder.

== Early life ==
His father, Johnathon, was born in England in 1773 and, in 1788, at the age of 15, was sentenced to seven years transportation to Australia. He arrived in Sydney in June 1790 aboard the convict transport Scarborough. In August that year he was transported to Norfolk Island. While there he met convict Eleanor McDonald. He returned to Port Jackson in 1795 and was joined the following year by Eleanor. The couple went on to have seven children, including John born in 1801. By 1806, Johnathon and Eleanor had 100 acres of land at Richmond.

Johnathon senior was shipbuilding by 1804 and as John grew older he was apprenticed into the trade. Some of the ships they built were put to work in the sealing trade in Bass Strait.

In 1822, Jonathan took John and another son to Launceston, Tasmania where they acquired land, began farming and built a house. They put their woodworking skills to good use, building a bridge and a new wharf at Launceston.

In Tasmania John came increasingly into his own, building small vessels and sailing on them on sealing expeditions into Bass Strait and engaging in bay whaling at Portland and Port Fairy on the coast of Victoria. By 1835 he was building warehouses on the wharf and soon had a steam-powered flour mill and shipping agency in partnership with Michael Connolly.
