= First Fleet of South Australia =

First ships to sail from England to South Australia

In 1836, at least nine ships carried the first European settlers from England to the south coast of Australia for the establishment of the City of Adelaide and the province of South Australia. Although not all of the ships sailed together, they have been referred to as the First Fleet of South Australia since all were carrying the first immigrants, including the founding planners and administrators of the new settlement, and all were represented at the proclamation of the new province.

== People ==
After a historic meeting at Exeter Hall on 30 June 1834, where the principles, objects, plan and prospects of the new Colony of South Australia were explained to the public, hundreds of enquiries from prospective immigrants started to arrive at the South Australian Association's headquarters in London.

The ships that sailed in 1836 would carry prospective emigrants as well as staff employed by the South Australian Company, a private business enterprise, and various appointees of the British Government to set up the new British Province of South Australia. Under the emigration scheme, labouring classes received free passage. They had to be between 15 and 30 years of age, preferably married, and needed two references. Steerage passengers paid £15-20, middle berth £35-40, and cabin class £70. Children under 14 years were charged £3 while those under 1 year were free.

== Ships ==
In January 1836 four ships sailed from England on behalf of the South Australian Company, ahead of the planned expedition by the South Australian Colonization Commission, the board set up under the South Australia Act 1834. They developed a settlement at Kingscote on Kangaroo Island, in July 1836, but when farming proved unviable, both the settlement and the Company's operations were moved to the mainland.

Four of the ships were sent by the South Australian Company, three were chartered by the Colonization Commission, and the other two were chartered privately. The ships began sailing from England in 1836 from January until about June, and arrived on the South Australian coast (all but one initially landing on Kangaroo Island) from July to December that year, with the new province proclaimed on 28 December at Glenelg.

It is difficult for scholars to arrive at a definitive list of pioneer ships given the lack of extant primary evidence due to poor record keeping and accidental loss of records. (Note: The Company's barque South Australian, which brought Samuel Stephens's replacement David McLaren to Kingscote, Kangaroo Island Kingscote on 22 April 1837, is not included in the list.) The following list is based on the best available records, ordered chronologically by date of arrival in South Australia.

Ship	Type and burthen (bm)	Master	Departure date (1836)	Nepean Bay arrival date (1836)	Holdfast Bay arrival date (1836)
Duke of York; 37 passengers	Barque,* 197 tons	Robert C. Morgan	24 February	27 July* (Note: Disagreement exists in the primary sources as to the arrival date of the Duke of York at Nepean Bay. George Kingston gives the date of the arrival as 28 July whereas Robert Russell, the second mate, gives the date as 27 July.)	
Duke of York; 37 passengers	Known passengers: (Note: Not a passenger list. These are representative names that might be found in histories or newspapers of the 1800s. For further names, refer to the external links at the end of the article.): Charlotte Hudson Beare (later Mrs Stephens) sister of; T. Hudson Beare; Mrs Lucy Ann Beare (died on K.I.); Miss Lucy Ann Beare; Arabella Charlotte Beare; Elizabeth Beare; William Loose Beare; Israel Mazey A.B.; Thomas Mitchell butcher; John or D. Neale, cooper; Charles B. Powell, gardener; Robert Russell; Daniel Henry Schreyvogel; Samuel Stephens; William West, laborer (with Powell, of whom nothing further known)				
Lady Mary Pelham; 29 passengers	Barque,* 206 tons	Robert Ross	7 April	28 July (Note: Disagreement exists in the primary sources as to the arrival date of the Lady Mary Pelham at Nepean Bay. George Kingston gives the date of the arrival as 28 July whereas Robert Russell, the second mate, gives the date as 30 July, which is probably correct, as the two vessels spoke to each other on the voyage out, and the Lady Mary was in close company with the Duke.)	
Lady Mary Pelham; 29 passengers	Known passengers: Cornelius Birdseye; Mrs Birdseye				
John Pirie; 28 passengers	Schooner	George Martin	22 February	16 August	
John Pirie; 28 passengers	Known passengers: Henry Alford; Charles Chandler; Mrs Martin; Charles Powell; Mrs Powell; James Powell; Mary Ann Powell; Henry Simpson				
Rapid; 24 passengers	Brig,* 162 tons	Col. William Light	1 May	18 August	
Rapid; 24 passengers	Known passengers: Alfred Barker; William Bell; William Bradley; Mrs Bradley; Robert Buck, sen.; Robert Bruce Buck; William Chatfield; George? Joseph? Childs; William? George? Claughton; John Duncan; Lt Wm George Field; William Freemantle; Edward Gandy (brother of Maria); Maria Gandy (Light's common-law wife); William Gandy (brother of Maria); Thomas Gepp; George Goddard; Robert Goddard; Robert Keate Hill; William Hodges; William Jacob; William Lawes; James Lewis; George Mildred; Hiram T. Mildred; George Penton; William S. Pullen; John Frank Thorn; John Thorpe; William Tuckey; John Woodforde				
Cygnet; 84 passengers	Barque	John Rolls	20 March	11 September	5 November
Cygnet; 84 passengers	Known passengers: E. Adams; James Adams; Mrs Adams; William Adams; Mrs Adams; John Afford; John Avery; Thomas Bell; Mrs Bell and children; John Brinnan; Robert Bristow; Mrs Bristow and children; Selby Brown; Bury; John Cannan; Samuel Chapman; Mrs Chapman; John Corney; David Divine; Joseph Finch; B. T. Finniss; Mrs Finniss; George Friend; Thomas Gilbert; John Goodman; William Green; Mrs Green and children; Alfred Hardy; E. Harrington; A. Heath; James Hoare; Mrs Hoare; G. S. Kingston; W. H. Kingston; John Levey; Berry Lipson; Thomas Lipson, R.N.; Mrs Lipson; Emma Lipson; Eliza Lipson; Mary Lipson; Thomas Lipson jnr; John Locket; James Marshall; Mrs Marshall; John Morphett; William H. Neale; Mrs Neale and children; Henry Osborn; J. Osborn; Stephen Paris; Mrs Paris; Charles Parrington; Edmund Parsons; Thomas Powys; Hugh Quin; Thomas W. Rogers; Basil Sladden; Isaac Sladden; Smythett Sladden; James Butler Stone; James Stubbington; Richard G. Symonds; William Teasdale; Robert G. Thomas; William S. Williams (Note: (c. 1817 – 17 August 1859) Not to be confused with William Williams aboard Africaine. William S. Williams married Maria Wickham (1820 – 17 February 1872). The death notice for Maria, 24 February 187 says ...relict of the late William Williams (who arrived in the ship Cygnet in 1836).2. She arrived with her parents aboard Africaine, on 12 August 1839. The will & probate for William S. Williams are available on FamilySearch, signed with an "X", so he was almost certainly illiterate. According to Ing (2020), p.80 (see in Further reading below) he was a groom. "William Williams had immigrated on the Cygnet as a twenty-one-year-old servant to deputy-surveyor George Strickland Kingston, but after arrival in South Australia he held the licence for the City Bridge Hotel, located opposite the Holy Trinity Anglican Church on North Terrace. He married Maria Wickham in 1839." In a lithograph of the "Old Colonists" Festival Dinner held at the rear of the City Bridge Hotel on 27 March 1851, there is a W. Williams listed as a steward. An account of this gathering mentions Williams, of the City Bridge Hotel, as caterer; and says that he was "the first [colonist] to drink Torrens water". There are many articles on Trove mentioning him, including a few in which he hosts meetings of the Oddfellows. In January 1850, Williams was charged with keeping a pig on the premises of the City Bridge Hotel, "in violation of the by-laws of the City Commissioners". There was a third William Williams in the colony, William Brabyn Williams, who arrived in SA in 1843 after two years in Tasmania; he was a blacksmith, who lived in Brompton and Bowden, and died in 1892.); Charles Wright; Dr. Edward Wright (Note: Dr Wright was at the meeting called on 10 Feb 1837 to discuss the location of Adelaide.); Mrs Wright				
Emma; 22 passengers	Barque	John F. Nelson		5 October	
Emma; 22 passengers	Known passengers: John Bennett; John Cranfield; Mrs Cranfield; Henry Douglas; Charles S. Hare; Mrs Hare; William Wilkins; Mrs Wilkins				
Africaine; 76 passengers	Barque,* 346 tons	John F. Duff	28 June	2 November	8 November
Africaine; 76 passengers	Known passengers: John Demmett Bagg; John Brown; Mrs Brown; Henry Bushell; Mrs Bushell and two children; Jeremiah Calnan; Mrs Calnan; Margaret Clarke; James Coltman; Mrs Coltman; Daniel Cox; James Cronk; Samuel East; Mrs East; Dr. C. G. Everard; Mrs Everard; William Everard; Robert Fisher; Arthur Gliddon; Robert Gouger; Mrs Gouger; John Hallett; Mrs Hallett; Henry Hill; Joseph A. Hill; Andrew Jacobs; Mary Lillywhite; James Masters; Mrs Masters; Charles Nantes; E. W. Osborne (died on K.I.) (Note: Osborne and Slater never made it to the mainland, having perished on an exploratory trek on Kangaroo Island.); George Parsell; Mary Parsell; John E. Pollard; Maria Pollard; John Michael Skipper; Dr. John Slater (died on K.I.); Benjamin Smith; Matthew Smith; Mary Smith; John Snoswell; Mrs Snoswell; Robert Thomas; Mrs Thomas; W. Kyffin Thomas; Frances Thomas; Mary Thomas; Helen Thomas; Mary Vincent; Benjamin Wickham; William Williams; James Windebank; Alfred Young				
Tam O'Shanter; 74 passengers	Barque	Whiteman Freeman		30 November	17 December
Tam O'Shanter; 74 passengers	Known passengers: Thomas Allen; Mrs Allen; William Bailes; John Barnard; Robert Botting; Henry Briggs; Walter Bromley; Maria Catchlove; Jane Catchlove; Edward Catchlove, sen.; Catchlove, jun.; John Clarke; Thomas Clarke; William Finke; Charles Forbes; Mrs Forbes; William Fouke; George Freeth; Henry Gilbert; George Guthrie; William Hardington; Alfred Jaques; William Jaques; Philip Lee; Mrs Elizabeth Lee; Thomas Maslin; Thomas Masters; Henry J. Moseley; William Moseley; William Nation; William Phillips; Mrs Phillips; Clara Rogers; Fanny Rogers; Josiah Rogers; Mary F. Rogers; Robert A. Rogers; Mrs Thomas W. Rogers; Robert Ross; Robert Seaborne; Mrs Seaborne; W. H. Shephard; Thomas William Skuce; John Stuckey; Mrs Stuckey; Edward Surflen; George White; John White; Alexander Woods; Mrs Woods				
Buffalo (1813); 174 passengers	Barque	John Hindmarsh		24 December (Port Lincoln)	28 December
Buffalo (1813); 174 passengers	Known passengers: Giles Abbott, jun.; Giles Abbott, sen.; Mrs Abbott; John Abbott; John William Adams; Mrs Adams; Frederick W. Allen; Henry Bacon; Cornelius Bean; Jonathan Bean; James Bennett; Mrs Bennett; Emily Blundell; Isaac Breaker; Jane Maria Breaker; Luke Broadbent; Mrs Broadbent; Samuel Chapman; Joseph Chegwyn; James Chittleborough; Mrs Chittleborough; Robert Cock; Mrs Cock; James Cock; William Coulthard; Mrs Coulthard; William Croxall; Mrs Croxall; William Ferguson; Mrs Ferguson; Charles Brown Fisher; Mrs Elizabeth Fisher; Elizabeth "Bessey" Fisher; James Fisher; James Hurtle Fisher; Marianne Fisher; Robert Fox; W. Henry Giles; Osmond Gilles; James Harvey; Richard Harvey; Mrs Harvey; Henry Greig Hewett; John Hill; William Hill; John Hindmarsh; Mrs Hindmarsh; Susan Hindmarsh; Jane Hindmarsh; Mary Hindmarsh; Rev. Charles B. Howard; Mrs Howard; Young B. Hutchinson; William Irvin; James Jackson; Henry Jickling R.N.; Warwick Langley; Philip Leigh; Arthur F. Lindsay; William Malcolm; Joseph Middleton; Mrs Middleton; John Monck; William Moore; Henry T. Morris; Richard Neville; Thomas Norris; Mrs Norris; Josiah Oakley; Samuel Oakley jnr; Samuel Oakley; Mrs Oakley; Thomas Oakley; George Ormsby; Kate Oxenham; Eliza Oxenham; Richard Pike; Mrs Pike; Frank Potts; Jacob Prowse; Mrs Prowse; Philip M. Richards; George Roberts; Mrs Roberts; Isabella Sladden; John Sladden; Mrs J. Sladden; Richard Sladden; Mrs R. Sladden; G. Stevenson; Mrs Stevenson; Giles E. Strangways; T. Bewes Strangways; Robert Walker; Mrs Walker; William Walker; James Way				

== Followed by ==
ships followed in 1837:

- Coromandel, ship, 600 tons, arrived at Holdfast Bay 12 January 1837
- William Hutt, brig, 240 tons, arrived at Port Adelaide
- John Renwick, ship, 400 tons, arrived at Port Adelaide 10 February 1837
- Mary and Jane, brig, 200 tons, arrived at Holdfast Bay
- South Australian, barque, 200 tons, arrived at Nepean Bay 22 April 1837
- Sarah and Elizabeth, barque, 450 tons, arrived at Nepean Bay 24 April 1837
- Shah, schooner, 160 tons, arrived Port Adelaide 4 May 1837
- Isabella, barque, 300 tons, arrived at Holdfast Bay
- Lord Hobart, brig, arrived 9 July 1837
- Abeona, schooner, arrived 29 July 1837
- Solway, barque, 400 tons, arrived 16 October 1837
- Katherine Stewart Forbes, barque, 480 tons, arrived 17 October 1837
- Hartley, barque, 350 tons, arrived 20 October 1837
- Peter Proctor, brig, arrived 23 November 1837
- Lady Emma, barque, arrived 4 December 1837
- Navarino, barque, arrived 6 December 1837

== See also ==
- British colonisation of South Australia
- History of South Australia
- South Australian Company
