= Israel Mazey =

British seaman (1812–1894)

Israel Mazey (c. 1812 – 26 June 1894) was a British seaman and pioneer of colonial South Australia.

== History ==
Mazey was an ordinary seaman on the barque Duke of York, which on 27 July 1836 was the first ship of the First Fleet of South Australia to make land in the province. There was some uncertainty about the spelling of his name, which appears in the ship's manifest as "Mazery", while one of the ship's passengers is listed as George Maisey.

Chartered by the South Australia Company, the Duke of York left London on 24 February 1836, under the command of Captain Robert Clark Morgan, and arrived at Kangaroo Island after 154 days at sea. The ship dropped anchor in Nepean Bay.

Mazey was one of the oarsmen who pulled the first boat ashore, notably carrying the ship's second mate, Robert Russell and a young daughter of T. H. Beare as the captain's nomination for the honour of "first to set foot on the new province". Once Russell was safely out of the boat, it was Mazey who handed to him the young Miss Beare, and he could carry her ashore.

The ship remained anchored in Nepean Bay for about six weeks. At the suggestion of Captain Morgan, a small party which included Mazey, Russell, Morgan, and Stephens, took the ship's boat up "Three Well River" (later named Cygnet River) on an exploratory trip. They became disoriented (Note: A later exploratory journey by E. W. Osborne and Dr John Slater, who underestimated the difficulties presented by the island's dense scrub, ended in their deaths.) but while trying to retrace their steps encountered a lagoon, with a multitude of wildfowl, so they had no shortage of meat and fresh water.

Six weeks after its arrival, the Duke of York set sail for Van Diemen's Land (Tasmania) and the whale grounds. Russell and Mazey were amongst her crew but Mazey "jumped ship" in Hobart and found employment locally. He then joined a whaler bound for Sleaford Bay, where a whaling station was being established, and joined their workforce. In May 1837, when their resupply ship failed to materialize and starvation appeared imminent, he was one of those who elected to leave for Kangaroo Island. Once their needs were satisfied, the others returned to their previous employment but Mazey decided to stay. In 1839 he joined a party, led by Ben Germein and his brothers, that took an open boat across Backstairs Passage to Port Adelaide. He worked in a woodyard for a few years, then in 1842 or 1843 left for the Old Port, where he made a living as a fisherman.

Other commentators had stories about Mazey that supplement or conflict with his own account, above. An obituary added that in the years 1837–1839 at Kangaroo Island he worked as a blacksmith, and at the Old Port he worked as a lighterman, and lived for a time at Bowden before settling at Alberton. He joined the gold rush to Victoria but after failing to make a fortune, tried farming at Blumberg before returning to his old calling as a fisherman.

Mazey's son William asserted that his father was the first white man to set foot on Holdfast Bay, having crossed Backstairs Passage with Russell in a small open boat. This would have to have been in the six weeks that the Duke of York was anchored in Nepean Bay. Not impossible but surprisingly not mentioned elsewhere. The date he cites, 28 July 1836, is not possible. William Mazey also asserts that his father made a "small fortune" at the goldfields.

At the age of 80 years he was still hale and hearty, but unable to walk very far. He was one of the last survivors of the Duke of York. He died two years later, after suffering two days incapacity. His remains were interred in the Alberton cemetery.

== Family ==
Israel Mazey (c. 1812 – 1894) married Hannah Woolman (died 19 June 1878) in 1843

- Joseph Mazey (1844 – 10 July 1911)
- Margaret Mazey ( – )
- John Henry Mazey (1848 – 2 July 1928) married Elizabeth Jenkins on 28 February 1878
- Sarah Mazey (1850–1933) married William Hone on 24 May 1869
- Mary Jane Mazey (1852– ) married George Jarmyn on 24 July 1871
- James Cluet Bull Mazey ( –1923)
- David Wohlman (later Woolman) Mazey (1856 – 1930) married Catherine (c. 1858 – 25 August 1891
- Louisa Mazey (1859 – 30 September 1879) married Johann Conrad Schaad on 1 March 1877
- Israel Mazey (1860– )
- Philip Stephen Mazey ( – c. 14 June 1934) married Mary Ann ?? (died 8 April 1936)
- Susanna Mazey (1865– )
- William Alfred Mazey (1867 – 25 April 1928) married Charlotte Ann Mends on 18 September 1901

For 50 years he lived in a small cottage in King Street, Alberton. Several of his children lived nearby.
