= Early Experiences of Colonial Life in South Australia =

1878 book by John Wrathall

Early Experiences of Colonial Life in South Australia is a book by John Wrathall Bull originally published as "Early Experiences of Colonial Life by An arrival of 1838" as weekly instalments in The Advertiser, repeated in its associated Chronicle and Weekly Mail.

After the Advertiser issue of 29 September 1877 the articles were only published in the Chronicle, and the last few were a week or two late. All may accessed via Trove, a service of the National Library of Australia.

The book is only part memoir; much of the narrative was contributed by the protagonists, whom Bull knew personally, and much of the content reflects his pragmatic view of history.

== The issues ==
- No. I. (5 May 1877) Disembarked near present-day Semaphore; a hanging; soirée at Government House; a riot; encounter with "lifers" Foley and Stone, escaped from Sydney.
- No. II. {12 May 1877) Henry Alford's account of the pursuit and capture of the outlaw Morgan. Alford appears in many of these episodes involving miscreants.
- No. III. (19 May 1877) Assessments of Hindmarsh, Pullen, Light, G. M. Stephen, Frome, Fisher and the first City Council.
- No. IV. (26 May 1877) Hindmarsh's rowdy Marines; Sturt's and Eyre's (erroneous) assessment of land for agriculture; absentee landowners and farm economics.
- No. V. (2 June 1877) State aid to churches; C. B. Howard and Osmond Gilles; Trinity Church; death of infant son; T. Q. Stow.
- No. VI. (9 June 1877) Arrival of Governor Gawler; criticism of deputy Protector of Aborigines James Cronk; spear-throwing demonstrations; Gawler's enterprise; death of James Brian; arrival of Governor Grey.
- No. VII. (16 June 1877) Bushrangers Henry Curran, George Hughes, and James Fox at Gawler, Mount Crawford and Crafer's pub, where they were captured, dead drunk.
- No. VIII. (23 June 1877) Hanging of Curran and Hughes; meeting outlaw Stone (Foley's mate); hiring Hart, another escaped lifer.
- No. IX. (30 June 1877) Hughes' hanging bungled; horse thieves John Wilson and Edward Green apprehended in Melbourne. Was third man the escapee Morgan?
- No. X. (7 July 1877} History of Bull's employee Hart; suicide of Hart's successor Moorhead; more on Morgan.
- No. XI. (14 July 1877) Aboriginal relationships; murder of Gilles' shepherd William Duffield.
- No. XII. (21 July 1877) Deaths of Bromley, Beevor; murders by Milemnura/Milmenrura ('Big Murray') tribe: Barker, Roach and Delve (attacked while salvaging schooner Fanny), Maria shipwreck survivors; Gawler's instruction to O'Halloran vindicated.
- No. XIII. (28 July 1877) More on Maria investigation.
- No. XIV. (4 August 1877) Rev. Longbottom family survive wreck of Fanny (Capt. James Gill) in same area, helped by (presumably) the same tribe; Gill first to enter Murray mouth.
- No. XV. (13 November 2019) Farcical arrest of Black Forest cattle thieves Dick Fenton, John Gofton, Joseph Stagg. Gofton's escape from temporary jail.
- No. XVI. (25 August 1877) Wesleyan Methodist ministers Longbottom, Eggleston, Weatherstone and Draper, who took final service at sinking of SS London 11 January 1866, and commemorated by Draper Memorial Church.
- No. XVII. (1 September 1877) Stagg found guilty of Gofton murder, insists he is innocent of that crime; John Benedict Lomas mystery: two conflicting stories, one confessing Gofton murder.
- No. XVIII. (8 September 1877) Pastor Kavel and German settlers in Hahndorf.
- No. XIX. (15 September 1877) Port Lincoln: Light's assessment; nasty cannon accident; Hawson exploration fiasco; Aboriginal murders; whalers; Lady Franklin selects spot on Stamford Hill for Flinders memorial.
- No. XX. (23 September 1877) More on Foley, Stone and Stanley. Foley proves to be a consummate bushman.
- No. XXI. (29 September 1877) Thoughts on land sale system; his early days in SA; incidents with drays crossing Mount Lofty Ranges.
- No. XXII. (6 October 1877) Sturt & McLeay's brush with Aboriginal warriors; attack on Field & Inman.
- No. XXIII. (13 October 1877) Meets Joseph Storey, petty criminal from Tasmania, who also escapes from temporary jail.
- No. XXIV. (20 October 1877) Early town fires: Col. Light, Government House, Octagon Cottage, flour mills, bushfire experiences; more on depression after Gawler sacked; Emanuel Solomon and Gilles Arcade; christening of cutter O.G.
- No. XXV. (27 October 1877) Capture of Bell Chambers; Carter escapes from new jail, recaptured then escapes again, finally caught by Alford; another escape by Dyer, an American who had hideout near Brownhill Creek.
- No. XXVI. (3 November 1877) Account of Bonney's cattle drive for Joseph Hawdon: usefulness of Aboriginal tracks; criticism of Mitchell's log; comparison with Eyre's cattle drive.
- No. XXVII. (10 November 1877) More praise for Governor Gawler; Menge's early prediction of rich copper deposits in the Flinders Ranges.
- No. XXVIII. (17 November 1877) Difficulties Grey faced in running the expanding colony with limited funds. Lawyers and well-heeled capitalists do well.
- No. XXIX. (24 November 1877) More on O'Halloran & Field expedition to Rufus River to recover sheep if still alive.
- No. XXX. (1 December 1877) More on O'Halloran & Field expedition, Aboriginal guides leave party; encounter with survivor of Miller's party (droving cattle for Alfred & Charles Langhorne); blames Grey's pacifist policy for spate of attacks on settlers.
- No. XXXI. (8 December 1877) Ingratitude of Langhorne; buried remains of Martin and three others by banks of the Rufus, site dubbed "Langhorne's Ferry".
- No. XXXII. (15 December 1877) Party to Rufus River under sub-inspector Bernard Shaw and Matthew Moorhouse, Protector of Aborigines, which title Bull queries, as perhaps Protector of whites, to protect drover Robinson's sheep and cattle. Around 50 killed without a spear being thrown.
- No. XXXIII. (22 December 1877) Summary of conflicts leading to Rufus massacre of 27 August 1841; Eyre stationed at Moorundee, juxtaposed with Archdeacon Hale's mission at Poonindie; faint praise for sub-Protector Mason; favorable mention of Point McLeay mission at Raukkan, South Australia; favors land grant to River Murray tribes; inevitable "blighting effects of civilization" on Aboriginal people; money wasted by George Gipps and Lord Stanley on protectorate system; praise for G. W. Hawkes; Aboriginal shearers.
- No. XXXIV (5 January 1878) Businesses ruined and confidence lost when legitimate payments repudiated by Grey's government; relates his own difficulties and losses in real estate transactions during this period.
- No. XXXV (12 January 1878] Problems of a wheat farmer; disastrous first attempt at driving bullock team; his invention of stripper-header taken up by Ridley; some harvest statistics.
- No. XXXVI (19 January 1878) Legislative Council created; stumbles upon unsold Section 295, passes to Gilles, becomes SA's first (silver–lead) mine, Wheal Gawler follows nearby; Dutton and Bagot find copper at Kapunda; Burra copper mines: "Nobs and Snobs"; praise for Grey.
- No. XXXVII (26 January 1878) Tolmer, Farrell and other police on trail of Michael Rogers, John Riley, Patrick Lynch, three of what was believed a gang of four armed Tasmanian bushrangers, who had been seen on Kangaroo Island and at Bowden's sheep station on Yorke's Peninsula.
- No. XXXVIII (2 February 1878) Rogers' gang apprehended by Tolmer, Farrell and company; their obdurate defiance.
- No. XXXVIV (9 February 1878) More on the gang following their escape from Tasmania; death of their fourth member; contempt for their previous jailers; reflections on lenient sentences and secular education.
- No. XL (16 February 1878) Publican Peter Sipp receiver of stolen property; tribute to Inspector Gordon; personal incidents involving Aboriginals.
- No. XLI (23 February 1878) Story of the brig Punch, returning escaped convicts to Hobart: similar to conjectured last days of Lady Denison 's but with a happier ending.
- No. XLI [sic] (2 March 1878) Inter-faith sharing of resources in first years; Presbyterians Ralph Drummond and Robert Haining; Roman Catholics Bishop Murphy and Father Mahony (though Vicar-General Ullathorne was not so welcomed by Colonial Manager McLaren and Governor Hindmarsh); wreck of Mariner with (Catholic) Fr. James Watkins on board, in the same area as Maria, but with no hostile contact.
- No. XLIII (9 March 1878) Hostilities in Port Lincoln district: fatal attacks by Battara tribe on 12-y.o. Frank Hawson; John Brown and his hutkeeper; Rolles Biddle, James Fastins, and Mrs Stubbs. Retaliation by Charles Driver S.M., followed by Lieut. Hugonin and troopers; search for culprits by Major O'Halloran; criticism of Missionary Protector Schurman for avoiding contact with Aboriginals for fear of his life.
- No. XLV [sic] (20 March 1878) Failed search for C. C. Dutton droving party by brothers Charles and James Hawker and three others.
- No. XLV (Conclusion, 13 April 1878) List of Aboriginals convicted of murdering whites and executed by hanging; thoughts on future deterioration of country and climate; agricultural use of recycled water; Governor Grey in New Zealand; New Zealand Wars and comparison of Aboriginal Australian and Maori cultures; more thoughts on Grey's term in S.A.; concludes by stating he wrote Experiences to counteract (unspecified) misleading reports.

== Editions ==
- Bull, John Wrathall (1878). Early Experiences of Life in South Australia (1st ed.). Adelaide: Offices of The Advertiser, Chronicle, and Express.
- Bull, John Wrathall (1884). Early Experiences of Life in South Australia (2nd ed.). Adelaide: E.S. Wigg & Son. Archived from the original on February 8, 2015.
- A paperback facsimile reprint was published by Nabu Press in February 2010 (ISBN 978-1145420939)
- A hardcover reprint was made available by Kessinger Publishing in September 2010

== Similar publications ==
James Collins Hawker published:

- Early Experiences in South Australia (1899), Adelaide: E.S. Wigg and Son.
- Early Experiences in South Australia, Second Series (1901), Adelaide: E.S. Wigg and Son.
- Hawker, J. C. (1899). Early Experiences in South Australia. Adelaide.

Alexander Tolmer published:

- Alexander Tolmer (1882) Reminiscences of an Adventurous and Chequered Career at Home and at the Antipodes London: Sampson Low, Marston, Searle, & Rivington
- Alexander Tolmer (1972), Reminiscences of an adventurous and chequered career at home and at the Antipodes (facsimile edition), [Adelaide Libraries Board of South Australia], ISBN 978-0-7243-0034-1
