= William Dutton (captain) =

Australian whaler and seaman (1811–1878)

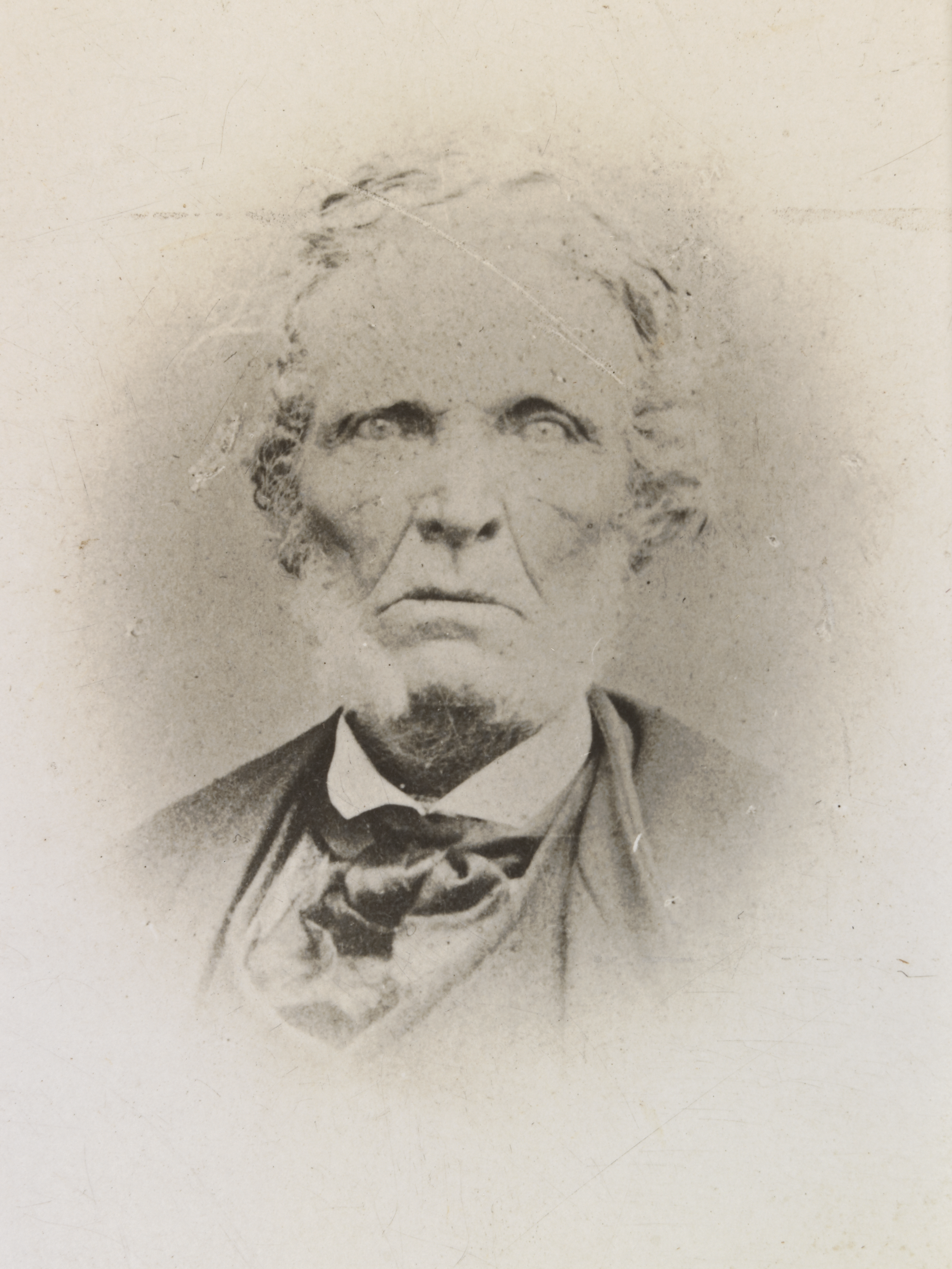
- William Dutton [ca. 1860-1878]
- Born: 31 August 1811; Sydney, New South Wales
- Died: 20 July 1878 (aged 66); Narrawong, Victoria
- Spouses: Kalloongoo, also known as "Sarah"; Mary Saggers (m. 1841)

William Dutton (31 August 1811 – 20 July 1878), known as "Captain Dutton", was a whaler and seaman remembered as a pioneer of Portland, Victoria. Posthumously he has been referred to as "William Pelham Dutton".

== History ==
=== Early life ===
Dutton was born in Sydney, a son of Henry and Margaret Dutton, who had emigrated from England some years previously; in 1813 his family moved to Hobart Town, at that time a major shipping port. He was employed as a sailor by Captain John Griffiths, a whaler and merchant of Griffiths, Connolly and Sinclair.

He first landed at Portland Bay near Blacknose Point in December 1828 with Captain McMullen in the schooner Madeira Packet. They were hunting seals, but they had become scarce and Portland Bay became better known as a whaling centre.

=== Career ===
In July 1829 he returned on the schooner Henry under Capt. McLean, to set up a whaling station, and built for himself the first house in Portland, at "Single Corner" (aka "Whaler's Point") on the sandspit; in January 1830 he was picked up by the Henry to embark on another sealing expedition.

He sailed to Portland with the Hentys' head man Alexander Campbell, and was in charge of construction of huts for the shore party. Dutton and Campbell remained friends, though later competitors in whale hunting. James Moore was a recruit for Dutton's ship.

By 1833 he was in charge of the Henry, and established a whaling station at "Double Corner" in March of that year, and was in charge of a whaling party for the Henty Brothers that same year. The Hentys' whaling station at Portland was established in November 1834.

He was at one stage first mate for Captain Hart, who in March 1833 took the first whale oil from Portland to Hobart. Between 1839 and 1841 he commanded the barque Africaine (previously part of the First Fleet of South Australia) on several whaling expeditions to the South Seas. He seemed financially secure, and may have owned the Africaine, but was undone by the bankruptcy of Griffiths, Connolly and Co. in 1842.

Dutton commanded the whaler Lady Mary Pelham that outside the whaling season sailed as transport between Hobart and Portland for the Hentys from 1844.

Lady Mary Pelham was built in 1816 as a brig, purchased by George Fife Angas (and converted to a barque by adding a third mast) for the South Australian Company as part of the First Fleet of South Australia. She was then fitted out for whaling.

=== Later life ===
In 1847 Dutton gave up the sea and returned to Victoria, and purchased a farm at Narrawong at the mouth of the Surrey River to the east of Portland, though he was involved in the occasional whale hunt, and was responsible for the last whale killed at Portland Bay, in August 1868. Whales had been used by the Gunditjmara people and when they tried to maintain this practice European whalers stopped them culminating in the Convincing Ground massacre where there is unto an estimated 100 Aboriginal deaths, after which Aboriginal people would avoid the region. He had little success as a farmer at either Narrawong or Bolwarra, and died destitute and his widow (who may have since married a Mr. Bell, but who also died) was forced to rely on the kindness of neighbours. She died at her home in Hurd Street, Portland.

=== Personal life ===
Around 1830, Dutton bought an Aboriginal woman named Kalloongoo, also known as "Sarah", as a slave from James Allen, who had abducted her in the late 1820s. Dutton and Kalloongoo had a child, "Sophie", around 1830, who was baptised in Launceston on 28 December 1836.

Abandoning Kalloongoo, Dutton later married a Mary Sagers or Saggers (c. 1820 – 23 August 1885) of Launceston in 1843; they had a home at Kelso, on the Tamar River.

Dutton and Mary were buried in adjacent plots in the Narrawong Cemetery. They had no children.

Claims have been made for Dutton as the first European settler in Victoria, but Edward Henty has the stronger claim, as Dutton's residency though earlier was not continuous.
