= Bushell =

Bushell is a surname of English origin. The name refers to:

- Achieng Ajulu-Bushell (b. 1994), a British swimmer
- Agnes Bushell (b. 1949) is an American fiction writer and teacher
- Anthony Bushell (1904–1997), English film actor
- Bill Bushell (1888–1951), an Australian rules footballer
- Browne Bushell (1609–1651), English naval officer executed for treason
- Christopher Bushell (1888–1918), English recipient of WWI Victoria Cross
- Edward Bushel (fl. 1670), foreman of English jury resulting in Bushel's Case
- Garry Bushell (b. 1955), English journalist, television presenter, and author
- Garvin Bushell (1902–1991), American woodwind multi-instrument musician
- Henry Bushell (1802–1875), boat builder and early settler of South Australia
- Jeffrey Bushell, American screenwriter
- John Bushell (1715–1761), first printer in Canada
- Josette Bushell-Mingo (b. 1964), British theater actor and director
- Mike Bushell (b. 1965), English television sports presenter on BBC
- Mike Bushell (racing driver) (b. 1989), English driving champion
- Mickey Bushell (b. 1990), British paralympic athlete
- Nellie Bushell (1884–1948), Irish textile artist and political activist
- Roger Bushell (1910–1944), South African pilot in Britain during World War II
- Stephen Wootton Bushell (1844–1908), English physician and Orientalist
- Steve Bushell (b. 1972), English professional football player
- Thomas Bushell (1834–1865), Irish convict transported to Australia
- Warin Foster Bushell (1885–1974), schoolmaster in England and South Africa
