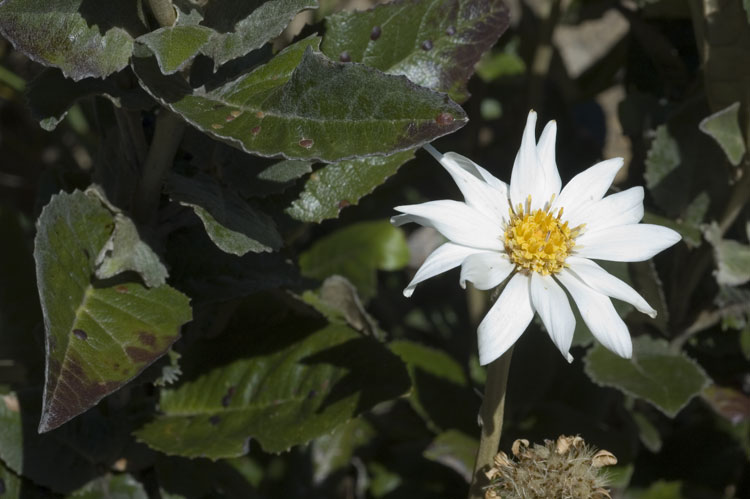
- in the Australian National Botanic Gardens

Scientific classification
- Kingdom: Plantae
- Clade: Tracheophytes
- Clade: Angiosperms
- Clade: Eudicots
- Clade: Asterids
- Order: Asterales
- Family: Asteraceae
- Genus: Olearia
- Species: O. grandiflora

Binomial name
- Olearia grandiflora Hook.

Synonyms
- Aster sonderi F.Muell.; Steetzia grandiflora (Hook.) Sond.

= Olearia grandiflora =

Species of shrub

Olearia grandiflora, commonly known as Mount Lofty daisy-bush, is a species of flowering plant in the family Asteraceae and is endemic to a restricted area of South Australia. It is a spreading shrub with egg-shaped leaves and white and yellow, daisy-like inflorescences.

== Description ==
Olearia grandiflora is a shrub that typically grows to a height of 30–90 cm (12–35 in), has many stems and forms suckers. Its leaves are egg-shaped, 40–100 mm (1.6–3.9 in) long and 20–60 mm (0.79–2.36 in) wide on a short petiole. The leaves are glabrous and shiny on the upper surface, covered with white or rust-coloured, woolly hairs on the lower side. The heads or daisy-like "flowers" are arranged singly on the ends of branchlets and are 60–70 mm (2.4–2.8 in) in diameter on a stout peduncle up to 120–350 mm (4.7–13.8 in) long. Each head has 12 to 25 ray florets, the ligules white, oblong and 20–30 mm (0.79–1.18 in) long, surrounding 35 to 50 yellow disc florets. Flowering occurs in November and December and the fruit is a cylindrical achene 5–6 mm (0.20–0.24 in) long, the pappus with 50 to 75 bristles.

== Taxonomy ==
Olearia grandiflora was first formally described in 1852 by William Jackson Hooker in his book Icones Plantarum, from material collected by Charles Christian Dutton. The specific epithet (grandiflora) means "large-flowered".

== Distribution and habitat ==
Olearia grandiflora grows in forest and woodland in the Mount Lofty Ranges region of South Australia.
