= Robert Russell (pioneer) =

Robert Fraser "Old Bob" Russell (c. 1806 – 21 December 1891) was an English sailor and early colonist of South Australia.

== History ==
He was second mate of the ship Duke of York, unofficial flagship of the First Fleet of South Australia, which brought the first British settlers to what became the colony of South Australia.

He is recorded as being deputized by Captain Morgan to carry ashore one or other of two daughters of T. H. Beare (Note: Either Elizabeth Beare (1834–1846) or Arabella Beare (1831–1905); or else the story is a fabrication, supported by the fact that Captain Morgan made no such entry in his log book. Israel Mazey, one of the boatmen, supports Russell's assertion, and incidentally points out that Russell's landing precedes that of Samuel Stephens.) that she might be the first to set foot in the new province, on 27 July 1836.

Russell remained with the Duke of York when it sailed to Hobart, arriving 27 September, thence to Sydney, arriving 12 October and then went whaling in the South Sea. They picked up Captain Dixon and about 27 crew from the shipwrecked Active from one of the Fiji islands, but then the Duke of York ran aground near present-day Gladstone on 14 July 1837, and the crew took to the boats, sailing more than 200 miles to Moreton Bay, arriving on 26 August 1837. One boat was set upon by the local Aboriginal tribe, who killed one of the crew and a boy from the Active. Russell and several troopers caught a few suspects, but they escaped. Morgan, Russell and others of the Duke of York crew were brought back to Sydney by the steamer James Watt, arriving 31 August 1837.

He returned to Adelaide as a settler, sometime before 1839, as he was assisting Captain Pullen, and was acquainted with William Light, who died 6 October 1839.

It is likely his later occupation was fishing, perhaps as a partner of Israel Mazey, a near neighbour and shipmate from Duke of York days.

== Family ==
Russell married Eliza or Elizbeth Hislop (died c. 20 July 1891) in 1839. Their children include:

- John George Russell (1840 – 1 December 1911) married Susannah Carrington on 11 June 1877
- Thomas Hislop Russell (c. 1844 – 22 April 1917) married Susan
- Robert Jordan Russell (c. 1845 – 26 June 1922)
- Helen Russell (5 October 1855 – 27 July 1942)

They had a home at Queen Street, Alberton
