= William Giles (colonial manager) =

Australian politician (1791–1862)

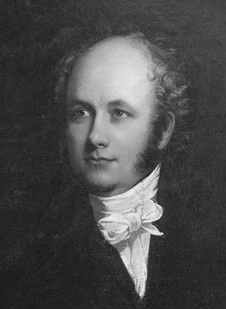
William Giles, c. 1840

William Giles (27 December 1791 – 11 May 1862), occasionally referred to as William Giles, sen. to distinguish him from his eldest son, was the third colonial manager of the South Australian Company, and a South Australian politician, prominent in the founding of the state of South Australia.

== Early life ==
Giles was born on 27 December 1791 in Great Staughton, Huntingdonshire, England, and was educated at Kimbolton School in nearby Cambridgeshire.

== Travel to South Australia ==
The new British Province of South Australia was established on 19 February 1836 when King William IV signed Letters Patent under the South Australia Act 1834, signalling the final action needed to establish the Province under United Kingdom law. Giles, a close friend of one of the founders of the South Australian Company, George Fife Angas, left England for South Australia on the ship Hartley sixteen months later, in June 1837. He was accompanied by his new (and pregnant) second wife, Emily Elizabeth (née McGeorge) (c. 1814 – 5 August 1876) and their 1-year-old daughter Emily jnr, together with all nine children from his earlier marriage to Sarah (née Roper). Emily gave birth to her second child, George Hartley Giles during the voyage.

The Hartley was a three-masted vessel measuring 27 x 7 x 5.6 metres built at Sunderland in England in 1836. Her owner and captain was Thomas Fewson. On 16 October 1837 the Hartley arrived at Kingscote, Kangaroo Island where the Company's first settlement was founded. Once in South Australia, William and Emily had a further ten children. By November 1837, the European population of the new province had reached approximately 2,500. The pre-settlement indigenous population of South Australia is estimated to have been approximately 15,000.

== Business life ==
Shortly after arrival on Kangaroo Island in 1837, Giles, T. H. Beare, and Henry Mildred imported a flock of Merino ewes from Van Diemens Land, some of the first brought into the colony, though stock losses on the unusually long trip aboard the Cygnet were considerable.

Giles was appointed Stipendiary Magistrate by Governor Hindmarsh in 1838 then appointed as the third colonial manager of the South Australian Company in January 1841, succeeding David McLaren. He continued as manager until 1861, when he retired.

== Political life ==
Giles stood for the Electoral district of Port Adelaide in the first elected parliament in July 1851, but was narrowly defeated by Captain George Hall. He was elected as member for the District of Yatala for five sessions of the South Australian Legislative Council, from July 1851 until 1854. He was a devout Congregationalist. As a legislator he opposed state aid to religion, as did his close friend, Rev. T. Q. Stow.

He died at his home in Beaumont on 11 May 1862.

== Family life ==
William's second daughter, Jane Isabella, described the family's new life, using pseudonyms, in her book "Family Life in South Australia", published in 1890.

A précis of Jane's book was compiled in 2015 including references to the actual family members.

== Family ==
William married twice:

- to Sarah Roper (25 November 1791 - 6 October 1833) on 1 November 1813, and
- to Emily McGeorge (7 December 1813 – 5 August 1876) on 12 January 1835.

In total his two wives had 21 children from 1814 to 1852, resulting in 78 grandchildren.

Children with Sarah Roper

1. William Giles, (9 October 1814 – 14 January 1875) married Margaret McFarlane (11 June 1821 – 22 October 1901), daughter of Allan McFarlane; home at Hackney then George Street, Norwood. He later had a business in Kanmantoo and was not involved in public affairs. Their son Alan McFarlane Giles ( – 24 November 1888), stationmaster at Tennant Creek, was the sole survivor of a relief party sent to Attack Creek in 1883, saved by an Aboriginal woman, and died of brain fever at Renner Springs five years later, following a murder to which he was a close witness.

2. Henry Giles (10 June 1816 – 10 February 1888) married Jane Leslie (1825 – 13 November 1892) in Scotland in 1845; home "Braemar", Stirling West. Co-founded stock and station firm Giles & Smith. Their eldest daughter, Amy, married George Fullerton Cleland in 1878.

3. Mary Giles (4 August 1818 – 19 September 1893) married Josiah Partridge (1805 – 27 November 1897) on 22 June 1840; home "Malvern", near Clarendon.

4. Thomas "Tom" Giles (20 May 1820 – 12 February 1899) married Mary O'Halloran (died c. 1 October 1915) on 20 January 1859. He developed pastoral leases on the Eyre and Yorke Peninsulas.

- Dr. W(illiam) Anstey Giles (c. 1860 – 7 May 1944)
- T. O'Halloran Giles (1863 – ) married Jean Balfour St. Clair Barr Smith (20 December 1864 – ) on 4 October 1888. She was a daughter of Robert Barr Smith.

- Hew O'Halloran Giles ( – ) married Nellie Cosford Verco (1901–1965), eldest daughter of Dr. W. A. Verco, and great-granddaughter of James Crabb Verco, on 27 October 1920

- Geoffrey O'Halloran Giles MLC, MHR (27 June 1923 – 18 December 1990)

- Robert O'Halloran Giles (c. 1896 – 9 April 1918) was killed in action in Italy.

- Dr. Henry O'Halloran Giles (c. 1867 – 9 March 1911)
- Eustace Giles (1866 – 24 December 1927), solicitor of Yarra House, Anderson-street, South Yarra, Victoria, died in London

5. James Giles (25 February 1821 – 20 December 1861) married Eliza Dean (c. 1823 – 5 April 1882) in 1848

6. Jane Isabella "Minnie" Giles (10 January 1824 – c. 19 August 1894) married Alfred Watts (c. 1815 – 28 November 1884) on 18 May 1842 They were the original owners of Leabrook. Watts was a fellow passenger on the Hartley with Giles and his family, as was Rev. T. Q. Stow, who performed the service.

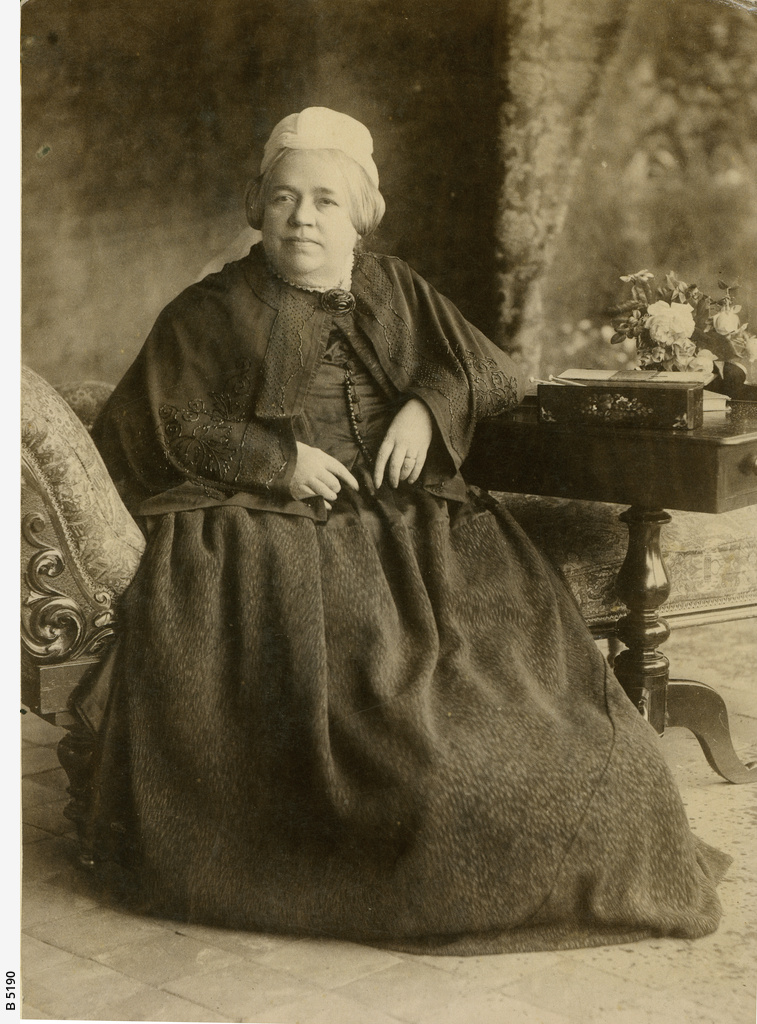
Jane Isabella Watts (née Giles) c1875

7. John Stokes Giles (6 October 1825 – 20 April 1826)

8. Lydia Giles (30 July 1827 – 25 January 1910) married George Waterhouse (6 April 1824 – 6 August 1906) on 5 July 1848. Waterhouse was Premier of South Australia from 1861 to 1863 and Premier of New Zealand from 1872 to 1873.

- One of their two adopted daughters married William Fitzherbert (1842 – 2 February 1906) in 1876

9. Samuel (25 June 1830 – 18 February 1839)

Children with Emily McGeorge

10. Emily Rebecca Giles (18 November 1835 – 24 January 1929) married Francis William Stokes (1832 – 2 August 1889) on 17 April 1861 developed Konetta (Coonatto ?) Station.

11. George Hartley Giles (2 August 1837 – 14 December 1876) was born on ship Hartley at sea; practised law, admitted to Supreme Court in 1862, but was struck off the rolls for misappropriation. He moved to Queensland, where he ran foul of the law several times. Later references are elusive – perhaps like Charles Whitmore Babbage, the family used its considerable influence to help him start over in another place, perhaps under another name.

12. Edward Hollingworth Giles (7 November 1838 – 18 July 1839)

13. Percy Ludlow Giles (27 November 1839 – 20 December 1840)

14. Leonard Hollway Giles (18 May 1841 – 15 January 1898) married Marianne Baily (13 February 1854 – 5 May 1901) on 12 September 1878

15. Hubert Giles (21 October 1842 – 11 August 1901)), prizewinning student at Adelaide Educational Institution, married Charlotte Julian Kingston (11 September 1845 – 20 May 1913), youngest daughter of Sir George Strickland Kingston on 17 March 1880.

16. Clement Giles (21 February 1844 – 28 July 1926), pastoralist, merchant and politician. A prizewinning student at Adelaide Educational Institution, he became Secretary-manager and first London representative of the South Australian Farmers' Co-operative Union, and later, sole elected representative of Australian farmers on the compulsory wheat pool of 1917. He married Isabel Cockburn (sister of Sir John Cockburn) on 7 August 1872

17. Louis Henry Lobeck Giles (14 July 1845 – 21 November 1902) married Alice Margaret "Alison" Andrews (9 February 1862 – ), second daughter of Rev. Canon Andrews, on 26 November 1884. He was a prizewinning student at Adelaide Educational Institution then a licensed land broker at the Grange and Adelaide.

18. Acland Giles (19 December 1846 – 8 June 1858) A student at Adelaide Educational Institution, he won prizes in 1856 and 1857, the second posthumously.

19. Mortimer Giles (12 August 1848 – 17 May 1914) married Agnes Reid Andrews (c. 1849 – 18 July 1907), the daughter of Mr. Justice Andrews, on 16 May 1874. He was a prizewinning student at J. L. Young's Adelaide Educational Institution. In 1904 he was appointed Registrar-General of Deeds, Registrar of Building Societies, Commissioner of Trade Marks, and Registrar of Copyrights.

- Mortimer Giles (1887–1979) was admitted to the Bar in 1912.

20. Caroline Ada Giles (28 February 1850 – 21 May 1933) married Charles Edward Stokes (1851–1911) on 12 June 1877. She had some success as an artist.

21. Florence Giles (13 January 1852 – 30 January 1930) married Rev. Francis Herbert Stokes (29 December 1854 – 21 February 1929) on 3 September 1879

- Francis Herbert Stokes, jr. (c. 1890 – 27 April 1915) was killed at Gallipoli in 1915.

Summary

		born	boy	girl	died	Age at death
1	William	1814	1		1875	61
2	Henry	1816	2		1888	72
3	Mary	1818		1	1893	75
4	Thomas	1820	3		1899	79
5	James	1821	4		1861	40
6	Jane	1824		2	1894	70
7	John	1825	5		?	
8	Lydia	1827		3	1910	83
9	Samuel	1830	6		?	
	Sarah	1833			?	Died at birth?
Mrs Sarah Giles died 1833
10	Emily	1836		4	1929	93
11	George	1837	7		?	
12	Edward	1838	8		1839	1
13	Percy	1839	9		1840	1
14	Leonard	1841	10		1898	57
15	Hubert	1842	11		1901	59
16	Clement	1844	12		1926	82
17	Louis	1845	13		1902	57
18	Acland	1847	14		1858	11
19	Mortimer	1848	15		1914	66
20	Caroline	1850		5	1933	83
21	Florence	1852		6	1930	78
