= Thomas Giles (pastoralist) =

Australian pastoralist (1820–1899)

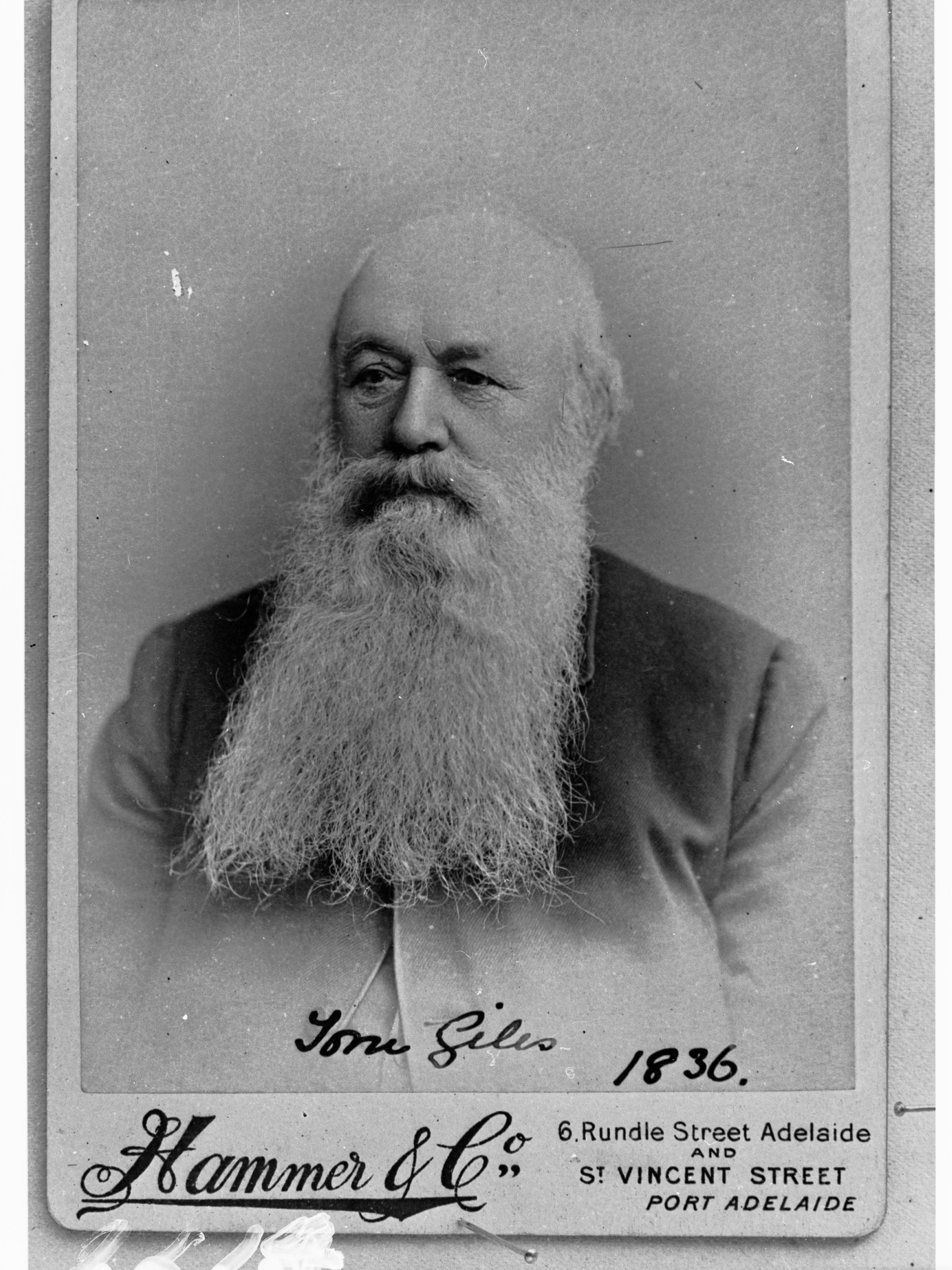
Tom Giles

Tom Giles (1820-12 February 1899) was a business associate of George Anstey and developed pastoral leases on Eyre and Yorke Peninsulas during the 19th century.

He was the third of the 15 sons (and 6 daughters) of William Giles (1791-1862), Colonial Manager of the South Australian Company (1841-1860).

He is remembered by the Giles Corner, in South Australia, the junction of the Main North Road where the Barrier Highway branches off towards Riverton, Burra and Broken Hill.

== Family ==
Thomas "Tom" Giles (20 May 1820, Mitcham, London – 19 February 1899, Adelaide) married Mary O'Halloran (24 December 1838, Belfast, Ireland – 1 October 1915, North Adelaide) on 20 January 1859 at St Mary's on the Sturt. Their children were:

- Dr. William Anstey Giles (29 June 1860, Glenelg – 7 May 1944, North Adelaide) married Rita Jones (c. 1862 – 9 September 1907, North Adelaide). Their only child, a son, died shortly after birth. He later married Mary - no other details known.
- Thomas O'Halloran "Tom" Giles (also known as T. O'Halloran Giles) (29 January 1863 Hartlands, SA – ?) married Jean Balfour St. Clair Barr-Smith (20 December 1864, Woodville, SA – 1 June 1961, North Adelaide) on 4 October 1888 at St Andrews Anglican church, Walkerville, SA. She was a daughter of Robert and Joanna (née Elder) Barr-Smith. (Note: T. O'Halloran Giles was involved in a car accident at Aldgate on Christmas eve 1925.)

- Hew O'Halloran Giles (27 October 1889 – 7 April 1987) married Nellie Cosford Verco (1901–1982) on 27 October 1920 at St. Andrews Anglican church, Walkerville, eldest daughter of Dr. W. A. Verco. Both are buried in Anglican cemetery Mitcham, SA.

- Geoffrey O'Halloran Giles MHA, MHR (27 June 1923 – 18 December 1990) He married twice.
- Diana O'Halloran Giles born c. 193? married David Evans born c. 192?

- Joanne Elder O'Halloran Giles (26 April 1893 – c. 1964)
- Robert O'Halloran Giles (c. 1896 – 9 April 1918) was killed in action in Italy. Buried in Belgium. Memorial in Anglican cemetery, Mitcham, SA.
- William O'Halloran Giles (9 June 1905, Mitcham, SA – 7 January 1985 Glen Osmond, SA) buried Anglican cemetery, Mitcham.

- Eustace O'Halloran Giles (20 May 1866, Glenelg, SA – )
- Dr. Henry O'Halloran Giles (8 June 1868, North Adelaide – 9 March 1911 South Yarra, Melbourne, Victoria)
