= Thomas Hudson Beare (pioneer) =

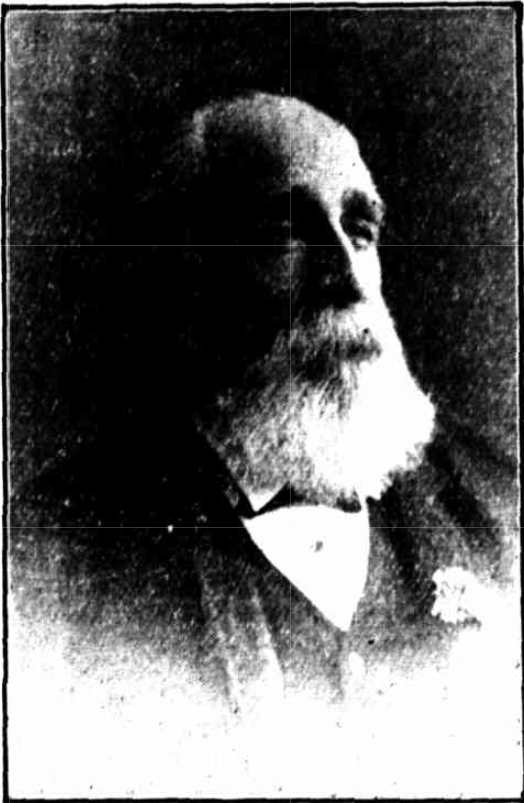
- T. H. Beare
- Born: 30 December 1792; Netley, Hampshire, England
- Died: 7 November 1861 (aged 68); Myponga, South Australia
- Known for: First storekeeper in South Australia
- Spouses: Lucy Ann Loose (died 1837) Lucy Bull (m. 1840)

Thomas Hudson Beare (30 December 1792 – 7 November 1861), commonly referred to as T. H. Beare, was an early settler of South Australia, regarded as the colony's first storekeeper. His daughters Elizabeth and Arabella have each been cited as the first of the fleet to set foot on South Australian shores, and his wife Lucy as the first white woman to die in South Australia.

== History ==
Thomas H. Beare of Netley, Hampshire, his wife Lucy, and their four children arrived at Kangaroo Island, South Australia aboard Duke of York, one of the "First Fleet of South Australia", on 27 or 28 July 1836. Lucy, who had given birth on board the ship to a daughter who died shortly after, died within six weeks of giving birth again, this time to a healthy daughter, Mary Ann Beare (1837–1907).

Charlotte Hudson Beare (c. 1782 – 16 December 1875), a sister of Thomas, was also a passenger. She married Samuel Stephens (1808 – 18 January 1840), the Colonial Manager, on 24 September 1836. This marriage, the second in the Colony and the source of much gossip on account of their age difference, was performed by Captain George Martin aboard the John Pirie anchored at Nepean Bay.

Shortly after arrival, Beare, William Giles and Henry Mildred imported a batch of Merino ewes from Van Diemens Land to Kangaroo Island, some of the first brought into the colony, though stock losses on the unusually long trip aboard the Cygnet were considerable.

In 1838 he purchased section 101, Hundred of Adelaide, and named it Netley, by which name the modern suburb is known.

He supported his brother-in-law John Wrathall Bull in his claim against John Ridley as the true inventor of the stripper, having built the prototype.

His widow raised their five remaining dependent children by teaching music, and died at the home of her step-daughter Mrs. F. E. Archer.

== Family ==
Thomas Hudson Beare (30 December 1792 – 7 November 1861) married Lucy Ann Loose (c. 1803 – 3 September 1837) in 1819. Their children included:

- William Loose Beare JP (7 February 1826 – 16 July 1910) married Agnes Charlotte Alston (1833 – 29 May 1892) on 17 July 1854. He is remembered for using John Wrathall Bull's stripper, built by Samuel Marshall, to harvest wheat at "Netley", his father's property, and testifying to Bull's priority. He farmed at "Bungaree" station, then lived in Clare, where he built a fine house later owned by John Christison, retired to Glenelg.

- Agnes Maria Christina Beare (1855–1942) married Adolphe Carnie (died 1909) in 1870
- Emmy Lucy Charlotte Beare (1857–1934) married George Klewitz Soward (died 1941) in 1880
- Violet Dora Beare (1859–1910)
- William George Douglass Beare (1861– )
- Charles Alston Beare (1863–1935) married Catherine Amy Howard (died 1930) in 1893
- Nellie Laura Beare (1866– ) attended Miss Steele's Seminary.
- (Margaret) Doris Beatrice "Dody" Beare (1875– ) married Archie Maclagan
- Noel Gilbert Beare (1878– )

- Lucy Anne Beare (1 March 1827 – 12 October 1861) married Francis Duval (c. 1819 – 21 October 1856) on 28 December 1843 and lived at Mypolonga. A report that she married again in 1860, to Thomas Howell Plummer, can be discounted. In her last weeks she was nursed by her friend Catherine Helen Spence, who acted as guardian to her five orphaned children.
- Arabella Charlotte Beare (27 Jul 1831 – 7 November 1905), claimed to be first of the new settlers to set foot on Kangaroo Island, married G. H. Williams, solicitor, of Auburn, and Quorn. married solicitor George Edwin Williams (1824 – 8 June 1897) on 8 September 1849, lived at Auburn.
- Elizabeth Beare (16 October 1834 – 9 January 1846), also credited with being the first child ashore in South Australia, by order of captain Morgan and carried by second mate Bob Russell. She died from burns sustained at "Netley" when her dress caught fire
- Girl child, name unknown, was born 1836 aboard Duke of York, perhaps in South Australian waters, died on the same ship some time between 5 May 1836 and 27 July 1836. She has been claimed as South Australia's first white birth.
- Mary Ann Beare (21? 26 August 1837 – 2 July 1907) married Frederick Edwards Archer (21 March 1830 – 18 January 1903) on 29 December 1860. She acted as nurse to her step-mother.

Beare married again on 24 October 1840, to Lucy Bull (c. 1819 – 16 September 1887), by whom he had nine children. She had emigrated with her brothers Joseph Bull and John Wrathall Bull and his family aboard Canton, which arrived in May 1838.

- Thomas Henry Beare (14 November 1841 – 10 March 1848)
- Emily Beare (17 June 1844 – 28 May 1925) married Robert Henry Edmunds in 1863
- John James Beare (1 March 1850 – 17 November 1884) married Sarah Edmunds ( – 1 July 1925) in 1875. He was a solicitor at Moonta.
- (Martha) Elizabeth "Bessie" Beare (10 August 1852 – 25 December 1941) married W. J. Kennedy; in later years lived with her youngest daughter, Mrs L. G. Harrison, at the Gap, Naracoorte.
- Edwin Arthur Beare (23 June 1855 – 7 March 1912), married Charlotte Jane Downing ( – 10 August 1933) on 15 June 1897. He was a solicitor at Kadina, and Mayor of Wallaroo.
- Thomas Hudson Beare (30 June 1859 – 10 June 1940) married Louise Newman ( – 1954) on 24 December 1885. He was a famous engineer and academic
