= Henry Alford (police officer) =

Australian police officer (1816–1892)

Henry Alford (12 February 1816 – 20 February 1892) was a police trooper in colonial South Australia, the colony's first mounted constable. He left the force at a time of low morale and became a hotel owner and publican, in which pursuit he was followed by his two sons.

== History ==
Alford was born in Acton, Middlesex. He emigrated to South Australia aboard John Pirie on a twelve-month contract as an employee of the South Australian Land Company, embarking at Kangaroo Island in August 1836.

One of his first assignments was to purchase and accompany from Tasmania (then Van Diemen's Land) two horses and two bullocks, the first brought into the colony. He was next employed by John Barton Hack, who had a small but increasing stock of farm animals.

Alford and two others volunteered as special constables to bring in three escaped convicts from Tasmania, led by the outlaw Morgan, whom they apprehended near the whaling stations at Encounter Bay. In April 1838 Governor Hindmarsh inaugurated a police force with Henry Inman in charge with the rank of Inspector, and Alford was one of the first of the twenty-odd men sworn in as constables, in what was Australia's first fully constituted police force. He was assigned to the Mounted branch, who were uniformed, armed and drilled in military fashion, as distinct from the Foot, or Metropolitan, service, who were more like the London "Bobbies".

In October 1838 the newly arrived Governor Gawler promoted Inman to Superintendent of Police, and in November James Stuart and William Baker Ashton were sworn in as sub-inspectors. Alford was a conscientious and efficient officer, making 54 arrests in three years, and by 1841 had been promoted to sergeant, and sergeant-major in 1842. Both Chief Inspector Alexander Tolmer, in his Reminiscences and J. W. Bull, in his Early Experiences refers frequently to his dedication and enterprise in tracking down felons, many of whom were escaped convicts from New South Wales or Tasmania. Alford was promoted Inspector in 1849 following the death of Commissioner Gordon, and in 1853 and 1854 was responsible for guarding gold shipments from Mount Alexander to Adelaide.

In September 1853 Alford left the force, leading to a public demand for an investigation into what precipitated such an action. His resignation followed the suspension, later dismissal, of Senior Inspector Stuart. and the earlier resignation from the gold escort, of Inspector William Rose A board of enquiry ratified Stuart's suspension, and furthermore removed Tolmer from command of the force, offering it to O'Halloran and, surprisingly, reinstated Tolmer as Chief Inspector, all following the confessions of chief clerk Orde, that he had been complicit in Tolmer's machinations against his subordinates.

Alford had previously shown sympathy with publicans, and in March 1854 joined their ranks, taking over the licence of the Stag Inn, corner of Rundle Street and East Terrace, then in 1855 built the Glynde Inn, of which he became licensee in June 1856. His son Henry jun. took the Red Lion on Rundle Street in 1858, then in 1860 the Golden Rule in Pirie Street. His other son, Edwin, took on the job of poundkeeper at Hectorville in 1868, assisting with the management of the Glynde hotel nearby, giving his father leisure time to devote to his garden and a relaxed social life. In 1876 Edwin quit the poundkeeping job, took over the hotel, married, and his wife served as landlady. On Edwin's death she continued management of the hotel until around 1911, so it had been in the hands of the family for 55 years, possibly a State record.

Alford's last years were marred by a throat complaint, which caused his death. His remains were interred at the West Terrace cemetery, with many members of the police force among those who attended the funeral.

== Family ==
Henry Alford (12 February 1816 – 20 February 1892) married Elizabeth Ann Drewett (c. 1816 – 26 June 1875) in 1844

- Henry Alford jr (c. 1839 – 21 March 1882) married Mary Davis (c. 1836 – 30 August 1880), second daughter of Mr. Samuel Davis of Glynde on 4 July 1860. He was licensee of Golden Rule Hotel.

- Samuel Davis Alford (1865–1866)
- Henry Edwin Alford (17 August 1862 – 23 February 1918) married
- Elizabeth Davis Alford (24 October 1868 – 1 November 1953) married Joseph Toy (1866 – 13 March 1912) on 5 August 1890
- Arthur George Alford (14 December 1870 – 12 June 1950)
- Frank Alford (27 May 1874 – 21 May 1878)
- Mary Ann Alford ( – ) married Conrad Ludwig Johann August Jahn (1854– ) on 15 February 1882. Jahn was licensee, Jetty Hotel, Semaphore.

- Elizabeth Ann Alford (1846– )
- Edwin Alford (1847 – 31 July 1900) married Evelina Moore Townsend (c. 1853 – 11 October 1915) in 1874 Edwin was poundkeeper, then landlord and licensee Glynde Hotel.

- Elizabeth Ann "Bessie" Alford (9 June 1875 – ) married William Stokes Lumbers ( –1939) on 23 September 1903
- Eva Alford ( – )

- Julia Alford (1849– )
- Elizabeth Anne Alford (22 October 1851 – )
- Mary Jane Alford (1854 – 10 August 1859) cited as only daughter.

He married again, to Ellen Taylor Hunter on 31 May 1877
