= William Buckton Andrews =

Anglican clergyman

William Buckton Andrews (26 November 1829 – 2 February 1918), better known as "Canon Andrews" was an Anglican clergyman in the early days of the Colony of South Australia, where he served in the Diocese of Adelaide for over 60 years.

== History ==
Andrews was born in Epping, near London, the fifth of eleven children of solicitor Richard Bullock Andrews sen. and his wife Emma Ann. Richard Bullock Andrews (1823–1884), best known as Justice Andrews of the Supreme Court of South Australia, was his eldest brother. After a few years preparing for a law degree he changed his mind and started training for the ministry at Radley College, near Oxford, though he was a sickly youth and little hope was held for his surviving long enough to take orders. His brother Richard had emigrated to South Australia in 1851, and encouraged by him, and sensing career opportunities, William and a younger brother set sail in the Norna on 27 April 1854 and arrived in Adelaide on 28 July 1854 with letters of introduction to Bishop Short from Dr. Tattam of Essex, staying with brother Richard for a few weeks.

He began his church career as a catechist at Balhannah and Woodside, supervised by Dean Farrell, Bishop Short being absent in England. On 29 June 1855 (St. Peter's Day), he was ordained deacon in Holy Trinity church, Adelaide, by Bishop Short, and served as curate of Balhannah and Woodside under the Rev. John Fulford, of Blakiston. In 1856 he was ordained a priest and was posted to a missionary position in the South-East, serving Naracoorte, Penola, Guichen Bay, and Mount Gambier districts, which meant a lot of travel by horseback, a severe trial for one without a strong constitution. At that time, although the farms were extremely lucrative, conditions were primitive and Church facilities almost non-existent. 15 months later, Andrews was forced to relinquish his post by an attack of typhoid, and was posted to St. James' Church, Blakiston, which served both Mount Barker and Nairne, replacing Fulford.

Andrews served there for six years, then five years at St. Michael's, Mitcham, then in 1868 returned to Mount Gambier, which had become a thriving town, with a handsome church, schoolroom, and parsonage, largely thanks to the work of Dr. William Browne. He was there five years before returning to the city, to take St. Bartholomew's, Norwood in 1874. In 1881 he was made honorary Canon, and full canon of St Peter's Cathedral in 1890. He served the diocese in this capacity until his retirement in 1914. He acted as rural dean of Kensington from 1889 to 1892, and again from 1895 to 1902. From 1902 to 1907 he was rural dean of the suburbs of Adelaide.

On his retirement in 1914, he purchased a home "Wonnaminta" in Crafers, where he died.

== Family ==
Andrews married Barbara Smith (8 November 1829 – 12 May 1912) at Comaum station on 30 December 1857 during his first stint in the South-East. Their children were:

- William Wallace Andrews (28 May 1859 – 1924), assistant engineer for railway construction, South Australian Railways
- Emma Mary Andrews (8 October 1860 – 1920) nursed her father until his death
- Alice Margaret (9 February 1862 – ) married Louis Giles (1845–1902), of Medindie, son of William Giles, on 26 November 1884.
- John Dugald Andrews (9 September 1863 – 12 October 1916), R.N.R., commander of the P. & O. liner Morea; died at sea.
- Barbara Campbell Andrews (2 July 1866 – ) married the Rev. Arthur Nutting, of Port Augusta
- Richard Bullock Andrews (29 May 1868 – November 1954) a legal practitioner of Western Australia

== Recognition ==
- In 1893 a special week-night service was held to commemorate his silver jubilee, when his old friend Archdeacon Dove, preached.
- On 1 October 1914 a valedictory service was held to honour him and his long and dedicated service. A stained glass window in St. Bartholomew's commemorates his ministry there.
