= Alexander Tolmer =

Australian police chief

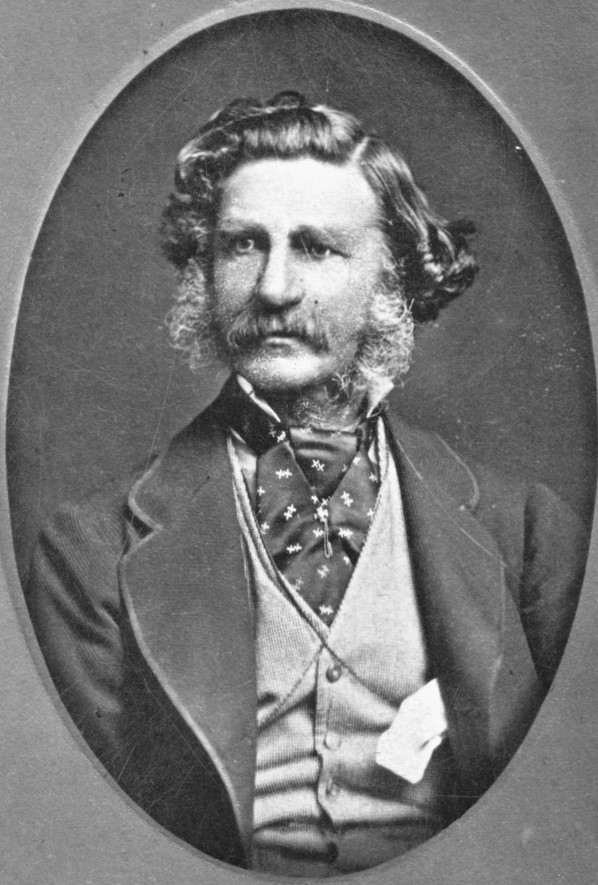

Alexander Tolmer (1815 – 7 March 1890) was a South Australian Police Commissioner. He was educated at Plymouth, Rouen, Maidstone and Hawkhurst. He migrated to South Australia in 1840 where he was made sub-inspector by Governor George Gawler.

In August 1840, Tolmer was part of the punitive expedition to the Coorong after Aborigines massacred 25 shipwreck survivors from the ship Maria, which had been travelling from Port Adelaide to Hobart. He was involved in the 1842 search for Charles Christian Dutton and droving party, believed to have been similarly attacked on their way from Port Lincoln to Adelaide, but no trace of the party was ever found. Police Inspector Alexander Tolmer was among the original residents of the newly established village of Norwood, South Australia, in 1847.

After several stints of acting in the position, Tolmer was appointed Commissioner of Police on 3 January 1852 replacing George Dashwood. He was instrumental in creating the Gold Escort route between Mount Alexander near Castlemaine, Victoria, and Adelaide in the 1850s (the first arrived in Adelaide on 20 March 1852 with around 600 lb (270 kg) of gold, the second, with 1,620 lb (735 kg) on 4 May 1852; it also carried mail between diggers and their Adelaide families) and also helped to establish the town of Bordertown.

He began acting erratically, as though jealous of his position, and determined to show up his subordinates. A case in point was that of Corporal Balls, whom Tolmer accused of not having, as ordered, posted a certain General Order in the messroom. Balls remonstrated that he had indeed done as he was told, and Inspector Alford (for whom J. W. Bull had the greatest respect) backed him up. Tolmer gave Balls five minutes to back down, which he refused to do for sake of falsifying himself and making a liar of Alford. Balls was summarily dismissed and Alford promptly resigned.

Senior Inspector C. W. Stuart (c. 1811–1891) was suspended in September 1853. In November 1853, following an inquiry into police morale and efficiency, Tolmer was demoted to Chief Inspector (he ascribed the blame to Stuart, his temporary replacement while on Gold Escort duty), and six months later was sidelined to the Public Service.

In December 1853, a board of enquiry ratified Stuart's suspension, and furthermore relieved Tolmer of command of the force, offering it to T. S. O'Halloran and, surprisingly, reinstated Tolmer as Chief Inspector. These moves followed the confessions of W. B. Orde, Tolmer's chief clerk, that he had been complicit in Tolmer's machinations against his subordinates.

Superintendent Tolmer was sacked by Police Commissioner Warburton in 1856. A well-attended meeting at Green's Exchange in March 1856 sent a letter of protest to Governor MacDonnell.

In 1882, he published his book Reminiscences of an Adventurous and Chequered Career at Home and at the Antipodes. The book is in two volumes (both available at the Internet Archive). It has been described, by the Australian Dictionary of Biography, as "an engaging and egotistical work".

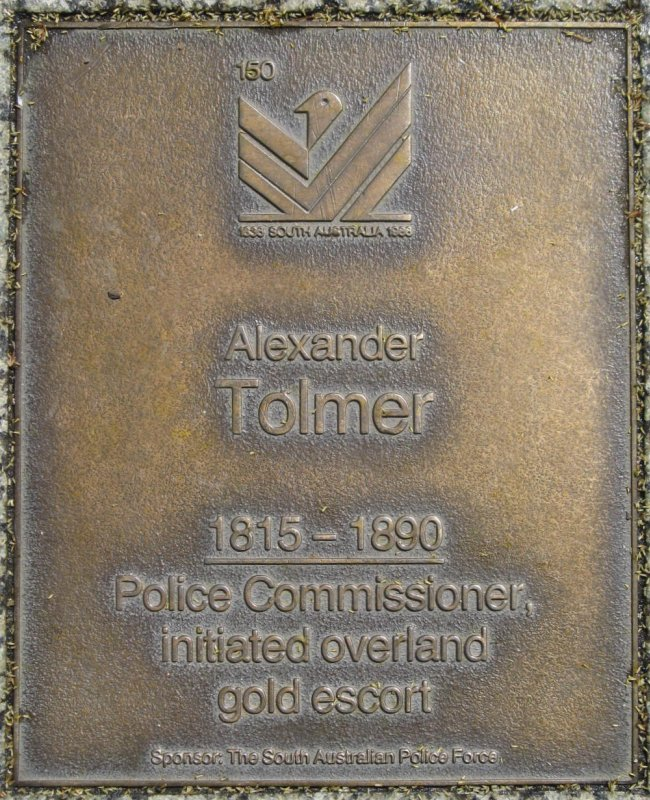
Jubilee 150 Walkway Plaque commemorating Alexander Tolmer.

Despite Alexander Tolmer's alleged character flaws and involvement in various disputes, there cannot be much doubt that his initiative and determination in relation to the implementation of the overland Gold Escort helped save South Australia from an economic crisis at a most vulnerable time in the colony's development. This feat alone earned him the respect and appreciation of many South Australians. He was energetic in his pursuit of law and order in the young colony over a long period and as Police Commissioner implemented significant reform and innovation to the service. He has been recognised with a plaque in the Jubilee 150 Walkway on the footpath of North Terrace, Adelaide.

Tolmer died in 1890 and was buried at the Mitcham Cemetery in an Anglican service. A son, Alexander H. D. Tolmer, was a drover, explorer, and manager of Arkaba Station.
