= Thomas Bushell =

Convict executed in Western Australia

Thomas Bushell (c. 1834 – 12 September 1865) was a convict transported to colonial Western Australia. He was hanged in 1865 after attacking a warder.

Thomas Bushell was born in Ireland around 1834; nothing is known of his early life. At the age of twenty-two he was an unmarried, semi-literate soldier serving at Malta, with a bad army record, when he struck a superior officer and was sentenced to life imprisonment and transportation. Assuming normal procedure, he would have spent the first two years of his sentence in England, the first nine months of which would be spent in solitary confinement.

== Transfer to Australia ==
In 1858, he was transported to Western Australia, arriving on Edwin Fox in November. He was initially set to work in the kitchens of the Convict Establishment, but on 11 January 1859 he wrecked some kitchen tools and used them to clean the boilers. As punishment for "willfully destroying Prison property", he was committed to the Refractory cells. There, he tried to commit suicide using a cord made from the lining of his jacket. He was subsequently transferred to the Lunatic Asylum, where he was put into solitary confinement. He assaulted the warders who came to his cell, and in consequence was kept completely locked up for about six weeks. After four months, Bushell was adjudged ready to be returned to the Convict Establishment, but on hearing of his impending transfer he tore up his bedding and threatened to kill himself and any warders who came near him. He was then adjudged insane again, but too violent for the Asylum, so he was returned to the Establishment anyway.

From this point on until his execution, Bushell was constantly in trouble. Margaret Brown writes: "the page allotted to him in the Character Book is so cramped with entries that they are difficult to read." His behaviour included threats of violence, persistent insubordination, refusal to work and repeatedly absconding from work parties. In punishment, he was flogged, spent weeks in solitary confinement on bread and water, was worked in irons for months, and at one point was transferred to the prison on Rottnest Island.

== Death penalty ==
On 9 July 1865, Bushell smuggled a 33-centimetre (13 in) dough knife back to his cell from his work in the prison bakehouse. That afternoon, he stabbed a warder in the shoulder, allegedly because the warder had told some prisoners that Bushell had provided information about other prisoners. He was tried on the charge of malicious injury with intent to murder. Bushell pleaded not guilty, and conducted his own defence. He claimed to have been urged to the attack by his fellow prisoners, and to have been drunk at the time. He insisted that he did not intend to kill the warder. The warder spoke in Bushell's defence saying he did not believe the prisoner intended to harm him. Bushell was nonetheless found guilty and sentenced to death. He was hanged three days later on 12 September 1865.

== General references ==
- Brown, Margaret (1981). "Probationary Prisoner 5270: Thomas Bushell". In Stannage, Tom (ed.). Studies in Western Australian History IV: Convictism in Western Australia]. Nedlands, Western Australia: University of Western Australia Press. pp. 51–56. ISSN 0314-7525.
