= Surrey River =

River in Victoria, Australia

Surry
- Location of the Surry River mouth in Victoria

Location
- Country: Australia
- State: Victoria
- Region: Victorian Midlands (IBRA), Western District
- Local government area: Glenelg Shire
- Town: Narrawong

Physical characteristics
- Source: Mount Kincaid
  - location: north of Glenferrie
  - coordinates: 38°9′25″S 141°21′53″E
  - elevation: 146 m (479 ft)
- Mouth: Portland Bay, Southern Ocean
  - location: Narrawong
  - coordinates: 38°15′37″S 141°41′57″E
  - elevation: 0 m (0 ft)
- Length: 46 km (29 mi)

Basin features
- River system: Glenelg Hopkins catchment
- Tributaries
  - right: Mount Kincaid Creek
- National park: Cobboboonee Forest Park

The Surry River, sometimes incorrectly spelled as the Surrey River, a perennial river of the Glenelg Hopkins catchment, is located in the Western District of Victoria, Australia.

== Location and features ==
The Surry River rises on the northern slopes of Mount Kincaid, north of Glenferrie and flows generally east through the extensive Cobboboonee Forest Park, joined by one minor tributary before reaching its mouth and emptying into Portland Bay of the Southern Ocean at Narrawong. The river descends 146 metres (479 ft) over its 46-kilometre (29 mi) course.

The river is traversed by the Henty Highway north of Heathmere and the Princes Highway near Narrawong.

== Etymology ==
The river was named by Thomas Mitchell on accepting the suggestion of the Henty Brothers.

== See also ==
- List of rivers in Victoria
