= Bill Bushell =

Australian rules footballer

Personal information
- Full name: William Joseph Bushell
- Born: 3 March 1888; South Yarra, Victoria
- Died: 5 February 1951 (aged 62); Subiaco, Western Australia
- Position: Defender

Playing career^{1}
Years	Club	Games (Goals)
1908	North Fremantle	16 (0)
1909	Sturt	11 (0)
1910	St Kilda	1 (0)
1911–19, 1923	Subiaco	121 (5)
- ^{1} Playing statistics correct to the end of 1919.

Career highlights
- Subiaco premierships 1912, 1913, 1915

William Joseph 'Joe' Bushell (3 March 1888 – 5 February 1951) was an Australian rules footballer who played with St Kilda in the Victorian Football League (VFL), Sturt in the South Australian Football League (SAFL) as well as both North Fremantle and Subiaco in the West Australian Football League (WAFL).

Bushell, a defender, started his career at North Fremantle. He was part of the Western Australian squad which competed in the 1908 Melbourne Carnival, however he was not selected to play. While away, Bushell was recruited to Sturt by their secretary and he spent 1908 playing with the club, in South Australia. He then transferred to St Kilda, debuting in the sixth round of the 1910 VFL season, against Richmond at Junction Oval. St Kilda lost the match by 13 points and it would be Bushell's only appearance in the league, as he returned to his home state at the year's end.

Known by his nickname 'Joe', Bushell resurrected his career at Subiaco where his brother Harry played. Used mainly as a half back flanker, Bushell was a member of Subiaco's 1912, 1913 and 1915 premiership teams.

Bushell died at his home in Subiaco in 1951.
