= Samuel Stephens (colonial manager) =

Australian colonial administrator

- Born: 1808; England
- Died: 18 January 1840 (aged 31–32); Mount Osmond, South Australia
- Known for: First Colonial Manager of South Australia
- Spouse(s): Charlotte Hudson Stephens, née Beare (m. 1836)
- Relatives: John Stephens and Edward Stephens brothers

Samuel Stephens (1808 – 18 January 1840) was an English businessman who was the first Colonial Manager appointed by the South Australian Company to the new colony of South Australia.

== Origins ==
He was born the eighth son of Rev. John Stephens (1772–1841) who was prominent in the Wesleyan Methodist Missionary Society and was President of the British Wesleyan Conference in 1827. His siblings included John (1806–1850) and Edward (1811–1861), both of whom were to be prominent in the settlement of South Australia. A quarrelsome individual, he fell out with the Wesleyan authorities in 1835 and applied for a position as an assistant surveyor in the proposed new colony of South Australia. Instead, however, he ended up being appointed the first manager of the South Australian Company.

== Manager, South Australian Company ==
He travelled to South Australia in February 1836 in the Duke of York (the first of the Company ships, followed by the Lady Mary Pelham, and the John Pirie) with 8 fellow-colonists and 29 labourers, and on 27 July 1836 was the first of the adult colonists to embark on Kangaroo Island, the intended site of the first settlement. His brother Edward asserts that Stephens leapt overboard in his quest to be the first on the new country, contrary to captain Morgan's express wish for youngest settler, Elizabeth Beare, to have that honor. Assuming this is so, it were a gross discourtesy and breach of protocol. The capital of the island, originally to be called "Angas" for the Company's chairman, was renamed Kingscote by Stephens.

The first wedding in the new Province was between Mary Powell, a passenger aboard the John Pirie, and William Staple, a member of the ship's crew. This was performed on 28 August 1836 at Kingscote aboard John Pirie, by its Captain George Martin. The second marriage in the colony was between Samuel Stephens, aged 30, and fellow passenger Charlotte Hudson Beare (c. 1782 – 16 December 1875), aged 53. This event also took place aboard John Pirie and was performed by Captain George Martin on 24 September 1836. The age difference between the bride and groom caused much gossip. His brother-in-law Thomas Hudson Beare (died 7 November 1861), who travelled with him, was the first storekeeper of the Colony, and father of Professor Thomas Hudson Beare.

Some accounts depict Stephens as an intemperate and inept manager tardy in administrative duties, and exceeding his authority. Suspended after he allegedly attempted to kill a sailor from a rival whaling firm at Encounter Bay, these charges were eventually dismissed due to lack of evidence. He was heavily criticised for the purchase, contrary to instructions, of 60 acres of town land for the South Australian Company, although many later came to applaud his action. Under pressure of being sacked, and well before the expiration of his contract of seven years, Stephens resigned his position in 1837 to be replaced by David McLaren.

== Explorer ==
Regarded as a good judge of land and agricultural prospects, many colonists eagerly sought his advice, including McLaren. He then concentrated on exploration of the colony for the purposes of land speculation and development, much of which activity was undertaken in conjunction with John Morphett, and in company with his friend John Hill. In this role he was an intrepid and fearless explorer of the colony. For example, in March–April 1839, in company with McLaren, aboard the Nereus, he explored Coffin Bay and Venus Bay on Eyre Peninsula. In August–September 1839, in company with John Hill, utilising the chartered brig Rapid, they were the first Europeans to explore the hinterland of Streaky Bay and Denial Bay. In October–November 1839 he joined John Morphett on his Riverland and Lake Victoria expedition, along with immigration agent John Brown (1801–79).

In 1839 he was appointed inaugural treasurer of the committee to found the Botanical and Horticultural Gardens. In October 1839 he was an inaugural committee member of the Agricultural and Horticultural Society.

== Accidental death ==
In January 1840 he joined a small party of four horsemen which included John Morphett to inspect the proposed Wellington Special Survey on the River Murray on behalf of the London-based Secondary Towns Association. During their return to Adelaide Stephens, who had ridden ahead, was killed while descending a steep spur known as Gleeson's Hill at Mount Osmond, on the brink of the Mount Lofty Ranges, when his horse stumbled and rolled over him. Some contemporaries said the accident was caused by recklessness, but that was doubted by others, who said that Stephens had only one month earlier dismounted and led his horse at that same hill for fear of an accident. He was survived by his wife Charlotte Hudson Stephens, née Beare (1788 – 16 December 1875), a fellow-immigrant on the Duke of York.
