= Narrawong =

Narrawong Victoria
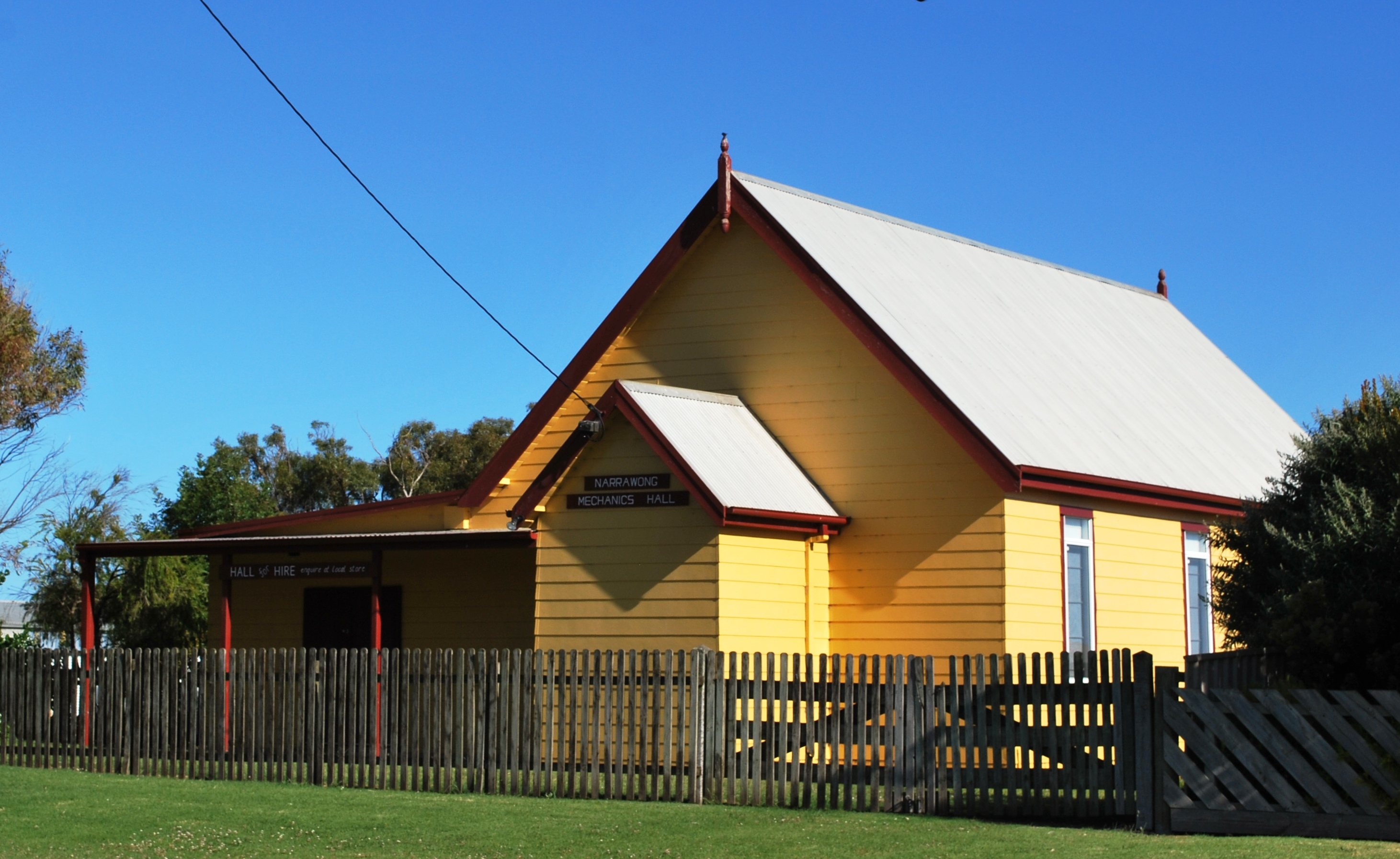
- Mechanics' hall at Narrawong

- Coordinates: 38°15′0″S 141°42′0″E
- Population: 160 (2016 census)
- Postcode(s): 3285
- Location: 344 km (214 mi) SW of Melbourne; 18 km (11 mi) NE of Portland; 8 km (5 mi) SW of Tyrendarra
- LGA(s): Shire of Glenelg
- State electorate(s): South-West Coast
- Federal division(s): Wannon

Narrawong /ˈnærəwɒŋ/ is a small town in south west Victoria, Australia located on the Princes Highway 18 kilometres (11 mi) to the east of Portland at the mouth of the Surrey River.

Narrawong Post Office opened on 1 March 1859.

At the 2016 census, Narrawong had a population of 160.

The Narrawong District Primary School is the town's primary school. It was formed after an amalgamation of the Narrawong Primary School, the Narrawong East Primary School and the Tyrendarra Primary School in 1994.

== Traditional ownership ==
The formally recognised traditional owners for the area in which Narrawong sits are the Gunditjmara People who are represented by the Gunditj Mirring Traditional Owners Aboriginal Corporation.
