= Robert Clark Morgan =

English sea captain and missionary

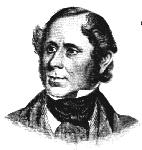
- Missionary ship captain
- Born: 13 March 1798; Deptford, London
- Died: 23 September 1864; South Yarra, Melbourne, Australia

Robert Clark Morgan (13 March 1798 – 23 September 1864) was an English sea captain, whaler, diarist, and, in later life, a missionary. He captained the Duke of York, bringing the first settlers to South Australia in 1836. His life in the British whaling industry has been recorded in the book The Man Who Hunted Whales (2011) by Dorothy M. Heinrich. His diaries are held in the State Library of New South Wales.

== Birth ==
Morgan was born on 13 March 1798 at Deptford, Kent, in England. This is recorded in his diary. His parentage is not known. No conclusive record of his birth has been found.

In his diary he does not mention his parentage apart from a few cryptic remarks. On Sunday 5 February 1837 he states, "I could not say that I had a praying Father or a praying mother or a Brother or Sister for I lost them young and knew little of them. I was cast on the world at the age of 11 years to walk the journey of life".

== Religious awakening ==
About ten days before sailing on his first command, he happened upon a revival meeting, and the result to him was eventful. This would have been in 1828. That revival service in Greenwich was led by Isaac English (baker and lay preacher).

Before he took up his first command in December 1828 on the Sir Charles Price he had been a reckless, boisterous profligate, living without a thought of God, except to blaspheme his holy name; but Divine grace now wrought so wondrous a change in him, that when he once more went to sea the old hands amongst his crew could scarcely recognise him for the same man. He who once never gave a command unaccompanied by an oath was now never heard to swear; and such was the force of his character and the power of his example, that in a few months' time not a man of his crew dared to use a profane expression while within his hearing. The discipline of the ship was not a bit lessened, and every one was happier, from the sobriety and good feeling of which the captain set example.

Robert Clark Morgan attended the West Greenwich Wesleyan Methodist Chapel, which was founded in King George Street, very close to Blissett Street, in 1816. The foundation stone of the Wesleyan Chapel in George Street was laid in September 1816 and it was opened on December sixteenth of the same year. It was capable of seating 1,000 people. The building may still be there although it has not been used as a chapel for a very long time.

== Wife and family ==
On 30 December 1822, at Deptford, Kent, at the Church of St. Nicholas, Robert Clark Morgan married Mary Dorrington. He was 25 and she was 22. He had a lifelong devotion to her. He states that they met when very young - the choice of my youth is an expression he often used in his diaries.

The marriage was registered as:

Robert Morgan Clark, bachelor of this Parish and Mary Dorrington, spinster of ('this', written, then deleted) the Parish of Greenwich were married in this Church by Banns this 30th Day of December in the Year one thousand eight hundred and twenty two, by me, D. Jones, Curate.

This Marriage was solemnised between us (signed:) Robert Morgan Clark Mary Dorrington

In the presence of { X The mark of James Gittens and

{Elizabeth Dorrington

The reason his marriage was solemnised in the surname of Clark is unknown.

They had seven children, most dying shortly after birth. There was a daughter, Louisa Clark Morgan, who died at 7 years of age and only one child, also named Robert Clark Morgan, survived the Captain and his wife. Both were baptised at the George Street Wesleyan chapel.

== Royal Navy ==
He entered the Royal Navy at the age of eleven, his diaries state that at that age (he was) sent to sea on board a man o' war. He talks of the man o' war as "a place where all wickedness is committed with greediness and a place where he saw every vice man is capable of committing".

== South Sea whaling ==
When he left the Royal Navy, in 1814 towards the end of the Napoleonic Wars, he transferred to the merchant marine, whaling. He began as an apprentice on Phoenix, becoming an able seaman and rising to first and second mate, and became a master at an early age. One of the voyages on Phoenix is described in the book The Dalton Journal edited by Niel Gunson. Morgan is not mentioned by name. However, there is a reference to the second mate, which Morgan would have been at that time.

Morgan was the master of the ships Sir Charles Price and Recovery, both owned by Daniel Bennett, an owner of many south sea whaling ships, and Duke of York, owned by the South Australian Company. She was the first pioneer ship to reach South Australia.

His whaling career in the Phoenix was: Apprentice June 1814 – June 1819, Able Seaman June 1819 – Sept 1822, second Mate Jan 1823 – Nov 1825, first Mate May 1826 – Sept 1828. Sir Charles Price, Master Dec 1828 – June 1831. Recovery, Master Dec 1831 – June 1835. Duke of York, Master Feb 1836 – Aug 1837.

In his diary later in life he reminisces about his whaling experiences:

Early this morning I went on deck. It was a fine beautiful morning, a clear atmosphere and fine blue sky with the ocean with only a few rippling over its surface. I saw a ship and went to the masthead and saw she had her boats down. Afterwards I saw the sperm whales she was after. She had taken whales before as she was boiling oil and the smoke was going in volleys from her tryworks. The whales were going as nearly as fast as the ship so we kept pace with them for 2 – 3 hours till at last one boat struck a large whale then another struck the same whale and eventually killed it and took it alongside. Oh how vivid did this bring back all my past experience in this work. The days of my youth and manhood was spent in this trade. This was the part of it I loved. A sight of a whale would make my heart jump and take away all relish for food. How happy if when a boy I could get to be let down in a boat and after I came to manhood how happy if I could but get to kill a whale and I always managed to get my share. All these things came fresh to my memory and these feelings rose up and caused a feeling not easily described, but I left it all for Jesus and his work. I will not repine how many hairs breaths escapes have I had in whaling, how many times has God spared my life when my boat has been staven, time after time.

== South Australia ==
George Fife Angas appointed Captain Morgan master of Duke of York. The South Australian Company had fitted her to take the first settlers to South Australia, and then go whaling after that. Duke of York sailed from St Katharine Docks on 26 February 1836. Duke of York finally set sail for the sea on Saturday 19 March 1836, having been unable to get away from the English coast due to bad weather for some five weeks. She carried 42 persons including the crew. (Another source said she left England on 5 April).

Some passengers, including some adults whose passage was charged to the Emigration Fund, were on board as well. The First Report of the Commissioners of Colonisation of South Australia gave the ship's complement as thirty-eight. A list compiled from the Company's records gave the names of twenty passengers and twenty-six seamen, in addition to the Captain.

Several of the passengers listed had significant appointments in the service of the South Australian Company. Samuel Stephens was the first Colonial Manager, and on behalf of his employers, he established the settlement of Kingscote as a site for their projected whaling venture. From its location in relation to the mouth of the River Murray, and the Gulfs of St Vincent and Spencer, he considered it as a possible shipping port for the future.

Another of the passengers, Thomas Hudson Beare, was Superintendent of Buildings and Labourers, while D. H. Schreyvogel was engaged as a clerk. Charles Powell and W. West were gardeners; Henry Mitchell was a butcher; and John Neale was an assistant carpenter.

They reached Kangaroo Island in South Australia and disembarked on 27 July 1836. When in sight of the island the previous evening Captain Morgan, a devout Wesleyan, gathered the passengers for a prayer meeting. When they landed Samuel Stephens named the river Morgan; it is now called Cygnet. Soon after landing Stephens conducted a short service to give thanks for their safe arrival. This was probably the first religious service on the shores of South Australia.

Most of the passengers wished to be the first to land in the new colony, but Captain Morgan settled the dispute very cleverly. He instructed the second mate Robert Russell to have some sailors row the youngest child ashore. This was two and a half year old Elizabeth Beare, daughter of the Company's deputy manager, Thomas Hudson Beare. Russell was instructed to carry the child through the shallow water and place her feet on the beach while the adults were at dinner. In doing so she was the first white female to set foot on that strand. When this happened the crew began to cheer and the passengers soon realised that a landing had been made without them knowing it.

The Company had dispatched Duke of York, Lady Mary Pelham, Emma, and John Pirie, with the intention that after they had delivered their passengers they commence whaling operations.

After leaving Kangaroo Island Duke of York sailed on 20 September 1836 to hunt whales. She was at Hobart Town from 27 September 1836 to 18 October to refresh; from there she proceeded to the South Sea whaling grounds. On Friday, 10 February 1837 Morgan heard of the wreck of the ship Active in the Fiji Islands and they took on board its Master, Captain Dixon, Willings the mate, and Wilkey.

Duke of York was whaling up the coast of Queensland when she was shipwrecked off Port Curtis (in Queensland) on 14 July 1837. Port Curtis is near current day Gladstone, Queensland. The whole ship's company got into three boats and rowed and sailed 300 miles to Brisbane, where they arrived Saturday 26 August 1837 after a most uncomfortable time. On the way down aboriginals killed an English crewman George Glansford, of Barking Essex, and a Rotumah native boy, named Bob, when the boats put in for water. There are parts of Morgan's diary that related to George's death. The Captain said that he was a young man, probably, early 20s. The Captain used to get George down to his cabin for religious instruction. He said that he recalled the Captain writing that George was not a hardened rough type. George apparently accepted his religious teaching. It seems as the captain had a sort of parental role over George. His journal that covers the period that he was master of Duke of York is water marked to attest to this experience.

They finally arrive at Morton Bay and the steamer James Watt took Captain Morgan, the mate and nineteen survivors on to Sydney, leaving the remainder to follow in another vessel.

== London Missionary Society ==
On Tuesday, 6 February 1838, three days after he arrived home from Sydney, he visited the Secretary of the London Missionary Society to see if he could take command of the missionary ship Camden. On 10 February he met the missionary John Williams, who was looking to travel back to Samoa with his wife Mary.

Morgan sailed in the Pacific in Camden from April 1838 till July 1843. He was with Williams in 1839 when Williams and Harris were murdered in the New Hebrides island of Erromango, now Vanuatu. The London Missionary Society invited children all over the country to contribute to buying a ship in Williams's memory so that his work could continue. Seven mission ships named John Williams were successively bought in this way.

When Camden returned to England, Morgan became captain of the London Missionary Society's first such ship, John Williams, and sailed it for 3 voyages: June 1844 – May 1847, October 1847 – May 1850 and July 1851 – June 1855.

In 1841 the Samoan Brethren suggested that he sit for his portrait when next in Sydney. However, it was finally done in London. The original artwork is held in the collections of the National Maritime Museum, Greenwich, England, and was displayed in the offices of the London Missionary Society. There was a copy reproduced in the journal The Congregationalist (June 1962 at p. 3) with an article about him.

== Retirement from the sea ==
Captain Morgan retired from the sea at the end of the voyage in 1855.

As far as can be seen in his diary that covers the period from 16 June 1861 – 29 March 1862 he spent a lot of his time visiting the sick.

His final diary that covers the period 15 March 1863 to 31 March 1864 tells of the voyage the Captain and Mrs Morgan made to Melbourne, Australia on the Yorkshire from about 30 March 1863 to 19 June 1863. It appears they came to be near their only surviving child (Robert Clark Morgan II). The son was baptised on 10 July 1829 at the Wesleyan Chapel George St. Greenwich. In the 1851 census Robert Clark Morgan II (aged 21) was residing in England with his parents at 83A Lower Road Deptford (also in the household was Mary A. Wallace, niece, aged 22, born in Greenwich, Kent). His occupation is shown as a clerk at the East India Docks. He had lived in Samoa with his parents for a while and went to Sydney in 1849. He then went to Melbourne arriving in about 1852 at the time of the gold rush. He joined the Victorian civil service on 20 September 1852 as a revenue collector. He died in Melbourne, Australia at the age of 87 years a very wealthy man.

== Death ==
Morgan died aged 66 on 23 September 1864 at Arthur St, South Yarra, Victoria, Australia, at the home of his son.

His dying words are that when he was asked by his son if he wanted anything was: "I want more love, more love to the Father, more love to the Son and more love to the Holy Spirit".

The headstone in the Melbourne General Cemetery reads:

Sacred to the memory of Robert Clark Morgan who died 23 September 1864, aged 66. He brought the first settlers to South Australia in the Duke of York in 1836 and was subsequently Commander of the London Missionary Ships Society's Camden and John Williams. His consecrated life made him a true Missionary and he was much beloved by the natives of the South Pacific. So he bringeth them into their desired heaven.

And on the other side of the headstone –

Also of Mary his beloved wife who died 12 February 1866 aged 64 years, and their daughter Maria Clark who died 18 October 1843, aged 7 years. Precious the sight of the Lord is the death of His Saints

The Reverend A. W. Murray in his book, Forty Years Mission Work, said "I have known many eminent Christians during my not-short life, but I have never met a more lovable, a more Christian like man than was Captain Morgan"

On 12 February 1866, Mary Morgan (née Dorrington) his wife, died at Arthur Street.

On her death certificate it said she was born at Greenwich, Kent. Mary and her husband Captain Morgan are buried in the Melbourne General Cemetery with their son Robert Clark Morgan II and his wife Martha Jane (née Short).
