= Charles Christian Dutton =

South Australian pastoralist

- Born: England
- Disappeared: 1842; Colony of South Australia
- Cause of death: Presumed homicide
- Occupation: Pastoralist
- Known for: Disappearance and presumed murder

Charles Christian Dutton (presumed died 1842) was a pastoralist in the Colony of South Australia who disappeared, believed murdered by Aboriginal people, while driving cattle from Port Lincoln to Adelaide in July 1842.

== Origins ==
Dutton was born in England, a son of John Dutton. In the 1830s he ran a store in Singleton, New South Wales with his brother Henry Pelerin Dutton (c.1803 – 30 January 1870); the partnership broke up in 1837. H. P. Dutton (for a time reported as "Henry Pelham Dutton"), then ran a property on the nearby (St.) Patrick's Plains, became insolvent in 1844, and took up a pastoral lease in Queensland. Henry was the father of Queensland politician Charles Dutton.

Charles Dutton arrived in South Australia on the Abeona from Hobart in March 1838. He may have gone back to England then returned with his wife Ellen, née White, on the Dorset in January 1839. In Adelaide he was appointed clerk of the Supreme Court, and acted for a time as sheriff.

== Likely massacre on Eyre Peninsula ==
Dutton managed a cattle station named "Pillaworta", near Port Lincoln on the Eyre Peninsula, on behalf of pastoralist Charles Driver. In July 1842 he decided to abandon it through fear of the local Aboriginal people, either the Nauo or Barngarla people, who were making hostile raids. Having taken his wife and children back to Adelaide by ship, he picked up a scratch team of Graham, Cox, Haldane and Brown (a former Adelaide policeman) to drove his cattle overland to safety near Adelaide. For the first day they had Lieutenant Hugonin of the 96th Regiment of Foot as an armed escort. Setting forth with 250 cattle in the direction of present Port Augusta, Dutton and his associates were never seen again, and no trace was ever found. There were indications that the entire party of five men were killed by Barngarla warriors somewhere near present Whyalla.

There had been an attack by Aboriginal people on the nearby farm of Rolles Biddle, a Quaker cousin of Samuel and Frederick White, associates of Herbert B. Hughes. Biddle was killed, along with Mrs Stubbs and shepherd James Fastins on 29 March 1842.

== Search parties ==
Several months later, when Dutton's party did not arrive as expected, search parties were launched. The most immediate, setting out in September 1842, was a determined party of four young pastoralist volunteers comprising the brothers G.C. Hawker and J.C. Hawker, William Peter, and James Baker. Governor Grey considered that this volunteer party was too small and ordered police inspector Alexander Tolmer, plus four troopers, to accompany them, but Tolmer fell out with the independent "gentlemen" and so returned to Adelaide, while the pastoralists not only continued on to Port Lincoln, but also chartered a vessel for a coastal search. Governor Grey then ordered the petulant Tolmer back into the search, but under the command of Edward John Eyre, supported by Thomas Burr. None of these searchers found any trace of the five men, although some of their cattle were later found wandering.

== Retribution killings ==
An unknown number of Aboriginal people were killed by soldiers in retribution for the presumed killings of the colonists.

== Legacy ==
Dutton Bay (now Mount Dutton Bay) near Port Lincoln, was named after him.

== Family ==
Charles Christian Dutton was married to Ellen Dutton, née White, ( –1853). Their children included:

- Charles William Dutton (1839 – December 1916) was from 1865 manager of Yaluna and Strawberry Hill stations for W. R. Mortlock, later also Coffin Bay and Waratta. He married Matilda Jane Swaffer (c. 1845 – November 1924) on 16 January 1862.
- Emma Pillawarta Dutton (1840 – ) married James Gall on 4 June 1863.
- Julia Eliza Dutton (1842 – 27 June 1916) married Edward Daniel Swaffer (c. 1842 – 4 November 1930) on 30 January 1865.

His widow married again, in Port Lincoln on 3 September 1845, to Thomas Bond Hawson.

Sydney businessman John Alexander Dutton (c.1800 – 13 February 1849) was also a brother. Another possible relation was Rose Ann Dutton (d. 20 October 1836). She married John Laurio Platt (1784 – 20 May 1836) in Heligoland around 1815; they later moved to New South Wales in the Providence under Captain Herd, settling in Sandgate in 1822. Platt was a pioneer of the Patrick's Plains area near Singleton, New South Wales.

They were not immediately related to the well-known family of Frederick Hansborough Dutton (1812-1890), founder of Anlaby Station in South Australia.

== See also ==
- List of people who disappeared mysteriously (pre-1910)

== Newspaper article ==
- "Early Days of Eyre Peninsula 1". Port Lincoln Times (SA : 1927 - 1954). SA: National Library of Australia. 31 January 1936. p. 3.
- "Early Days of Eyre Peninsula 2". Port Lincoln Times (SA : 1927 - 1954). SA: National Library of Australia. 7 February 1936. p. 3.
- "Early Days of Eyre Peninsula 3". Port Lincoln Times (SA : 1927 - 1954). SA: National Library of Australia. 14 February 1936. p. 3.
- "Early Days of Eyre Peninsula 4". Port Lincoln Times (SA : 1927 - 1954). SA: National Library of Australia. 21 February 1936. p. 3.
- "Early Days of Eyre Peninsula 5". Port Lincoln Times (SA : 1927 - 1954). SA: National Library of Australia. 28 February 1936. p. 3.
- "Early Days of Eyre Peninsula 6". Port Lincoln Times (SA : 1927 - 1954). SA: National Library of Australia. 6 March 1936. p. 3.
- "Early Days of Eyre Peninsula 7". Port Lincoln Times (SA : 1927 - 1954). SA: National Library of Australia. 13 March 1936. p. 3.
