= John Wrathall Bull =

Australiansettler and inventor

- Born: 23 June 1804; St. Paul's Cray, Kent, England
- Died: 21 September 1886 (aged 82); College Park, South Australia, Australia

John Wrathall Bull (23 June 1804 – 21 September 1886) was a settler, inventor and author in the early days of colonial South Australia.

== History ==
=== Early life and emigration ===
Born in St Paul's Cray, Kent, England, Bull was a dairy farmer in Cheshire and Bedfordshire, before applying as a farmer and shepherd for free passage to the new colony of South Australia.

In May 1838, Bull arrived in Adelaide aboard Canton with his wife and two infant sons. He acted as an agent for absentee landholders in South Australia and farmed in the Mount Barker and Rapid Bay districts. In 1852, he visited the Victorian goldfields but returned to South Australia the following year.

=== Invention ===
Bull was known for his creation of the agricultural stripping machine which he developed but was controversially beaten to the title of the inventor by John Ridley. The controversy was revived in 1875, when the University of Adelaide proposed to establish a "Ridley" chair of agriculture. Bull successful petitioned parliament in 1880 for a grant of recognition of his invention and after a long inquiry, was given £250 in 1882 "for services in improving agricultural machinery". Later research has supported Ridley's claim.

=== Military service ===
Also involved in South Australia's colonial militia, Bull was made lieutenant in command of the companies at Mitcham and Glen Osmond.

=== Authorship ===
Bull's major contribution to the history of colonial South Australia was the publication of his Early Experiences of Colonial Life in South Australia (Adelaide, 1878), a series of more-or-less coherent reminiscences originally published in serial form over eight months in The South Australian Chronicle and Weekly Mail, the earliest installments having first appeared in the associated daily The Advertiser.

Revised and enlarged with more of the same, the work was republished in Adelaide and London in 1884.

== Death ==
Bull died at College Park on 21 September 1886 and was survived by two of his ten children.

== Family ==
Three children of Rev. J. Bull ( – ) of Northamptonshire emigrated to South Australia aboard Canton, arriving in May 1838:

- John Wrathall Bull (23 June 1804 – 21 September 1886) married (Mary) Brant Bowyer (c. 1815 – 25 February 1882). Among their children were:

- John Bowyer Bull (1835 – 21 May 1907) married Margaret Ellen Carey ( – ) in 1868; Annie Payne ( – ) in 1883. He was an explorer of Streaky Bay

- Ethel Victoria Bull (14 June 1884 – 11 November 1975) married Franz "Frank" Koch (1877 – 7 February 1955) in Broken Hill on 17 February 1910. He was a cartoonist for The Gadfly and elsewhere. They had a son Franz Bowyer Koch (1911–1940)

- Robert Peel Bull (1837 – 1913)
- Lucy Lakin Bull (30 September 1844 – 27 September 1939), a prominent defender of her father's claims as an inventor
- Fanny Yatala Bull ( – 26 August 1929)

- Lucy Bull (c. 1819 – 16 September 1887) married Thomas Hudson Beare (c. 1798 – 7 November 1861) on 24 October 1840. He had five children by his first wife Lucy Ann née Loose (c. 1803 – 3 September 1837). Lucy and Thomas had another five children to reach adulthood, most notably the engineering academic Thomas Hudson Beare.
- Joseph Bull ( – 10 January 1857) married Jane Rundle (c. 1822 – 13 May 1908) around 1840 and had five children. He was a pharmacist in Strathalbyn; committed suicide by taking morphine.
