= Henry Bushell =

English boat builder

Henry Bushell (c. 1802 – 3 June 1875) was an English boat builder and early settler in the colony of South Australia.

== History ==
Bushell was a boatbuilder of Kent, England, who with his wife and two children boarded the barque Africaine, Captain Duff, for South Australia in 1836, arriving at Kingscote, Kangaroo Island, on 5 November, 1836. Most of the passengers were prospective settlers and joined the rest of the First Fleet of South Australia on the mainland, where the colony was proclaimed on 28 December 1836. John Hallett, Dr. Everard, and Robert Thomas sen., were prominent shipmates. Bushell and family elected to remain on the island, as his skills were needed by the S.A. Whaling Company, building and repairing boats for the company. He was there for three years, then removed to Port Adelaide where he pursued his trade, and at Encounter Bay. Their first house was built on piles or stumps in the unstable ground where the Birkenhead Hotel later stood. They later moved to Woodville, then to Mount Pleasant.

Bushell was responsible for the first boats built in the colony, and later constructed a boat for the Government, which was the first to enter the Murray Mouth from the sea, skippered by Captain (later Admiral) William Pullen. The vessel, identified as the cutter Water Witch, and the feat of seamanship shown, were derided by Giles Strangways.

His son, John Phillis Bushell (c. 1828 – 8 March 1899), who was born in Deal, Kent, also arrived in the Africaine on 5 November 1836. He was a successful farmer and amateur veterinarian. He later became licensee of the Two Wells Hotel, and later of the Nelson's Victory Hotel, at Edwardstown. In 1880 it became the Avoca Hotel; a modern hotel of that name traded at 893 South Road well into the 21st-century. He had a home at Victoria Terrace, New Parkside (later became Unley). He was named for his father's great friend, James Phillis, of Updown Park, Mount Pleasant, and married his daughter, Charlotte Phillis in 1849. (Note: And James Phillis's grandson was named John Bushell Phillis (1863–1947)) One son, Henry Bushell, was a notable bushman and Senior-Constable of Police.
