= Lady Mary Pelham (1816 ship) =

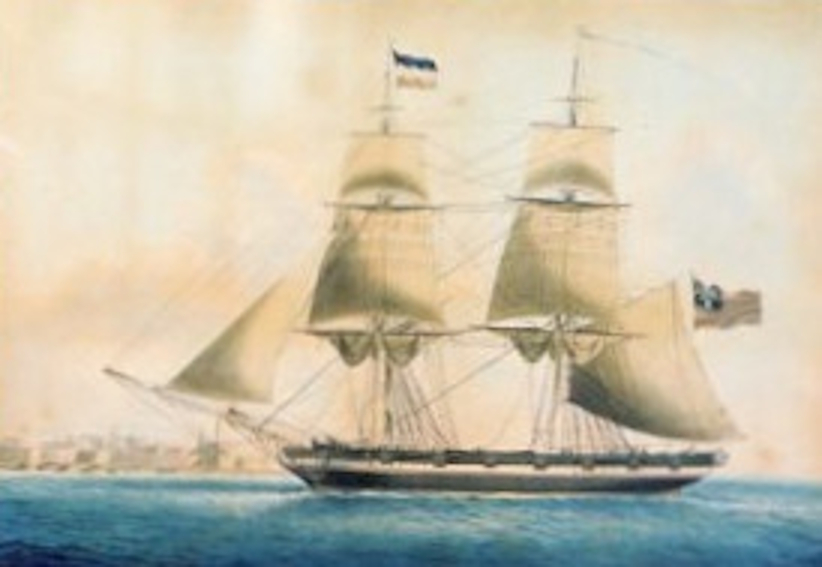
- HMPacket Lady Mary Pelham, at Valletta, 1818; Nicolas S. Cammillieri, National Maritime Museum Cornwall (Note: There is considerable controversy about the identity of this artist. The Maritime Museum, Cornwall attributes the series to a Nicholas Cammillieri (ca.1773–1880); the Peabody Essex Museum, Massachusetts to the French Nicholas Cammillieri (1768–1828), whose son Nicholas S. Cammillieri (ca.1798–1856) was also a painter of maritime subjects.)

History

United Kingdom
- Name: Lady Mary Pelham
- Namesake: Mary Pelham, Countess of Chichester
- Builder: John Pelham of Rotherhithe
- Launched: 1816
- Fate: Wrecked 31 August 1849

General characteristics
- Class & type: Falmouth Packet
- Tons burthen: 193, or 202, or 206, or 207 (bm)
- Length: 84 ft 2 in (25.7 m)
- Beam: 24 ft 0 in (7.3 m)
- Sail plan: Brig, later barque
- Complement: 21 (packet)
- Armament: 2 × 9-pounder guns (Packet)

Lady Mary Pelham was a brig launched in 1816 that initially worked as a Falmouth packet. After her modification to a barque she became part of the South Australia Company's fleet of 1836. She later served as a whaler and transport between Van Diemen's Land and Portland, Victoria. She was wrecked in 1849.

== The first 20 years ==
Lady Mary Pelham first appeared in Lloyd's Register with Hay as master and owner, and trade Falmouth packet. Her first captain, James Hay, took charge of her on 10 February 1816.

Henry Cary, R.N., became master on 5 January 1821.

In 1822, under Anselm Hatch, Lady Mary Pelham carried Irish migrants to New York City.

In 1826, the Packet Service opened a new service to Vera Cruz and Tampico, via Jamaica, and back to Falmouth via Havana. Lady Mary Pelham proved the route during October 1826 to January 1827. The Packet Service found the route profitable due to carrying bullion for the Mexican treasury, and mercury to Mexico for processing gold ore.

Year	Master	Owner	Trade	Source
1830	H.Carey	Symmons & Co.	Packet	LR

Lady Mary Pelham sailed from Rio de Janeiro on 5 December 1832 direct for Britain. She was carrying 800,000 dollars transhipped from HMS Clio. Clio had received the money, which was for merchants' account, from HMS Samarang, which had brought it from Peru. Lady Mary Pelham arrived in Britain around 8 February 1833.

== In Australia ==
Lloyd's Register for 1836 showed Lady Mary Pelham with R. Ross, master, the South Australian Company as owner, and with trade London–Australia. She had undergone a large repair in 1830.

George Fife Angas chartered Lady Mary Pelham. She left Portsmouth for Adelaide 30 March 1836 under Captain Robert Ross, and was the third of the fleet to leave. Her only full fare-paying passengers were Cornelius Birdseye and Mrs Birdseye. There were also five assisted emigrants, several of whom were also working as crew members. Her first mate, James Doine Thompson, died at sea. She arrived at Nepean Bay (Kangaroo Island) on 30 July. One source states that she had 29 passengers, all adults.

Lady Mary Pelham sailed from South Australia to Hobart to fit-out for a whaling voyage, arriving there 25 September. She departed Hobart under Captain Ross on 15 October 1836 for the South Sea Fishery. She cruised among the Solomon Islands and was reported at Carteret Harbour, New Ireland, where she spoke the US whaler Mechanic. In April 1837 she arrived Sourabaya in a leaky state, the crew "in a state of almost mutiny owing, it is said, to the conduct of the captain." Only a small amount of whale oil had been taken and it was decided to convert the cruise to a trading voyage. Accordingly, she took aboard 2,000 bags of sugar and departed for Sydney, arriving there 2 May 1838.

S.G. Henty & Co. of Portland, Victoria, purchased her and refitted her in Hobart Town as a whaler. As a whaler under the Hentys, her first captain was John Mills, followed in 1841 by John Harper, then in 1844 by William Dutton (1811–1878), sometimes referred to as "William Pelham Dutton". Dutton killed 100 whales in his career, the last being in 1866, and is considered one of the founders of Portland. In all, the vessel made 7 whaling voyages between 1836 and 1845. Dutton gave up command of Lady Mary Pelham in 1847 to Rosevear; Henty sold her that same year. She underwent repairs in Launceston and put in the charge of Captain Thomas Wing.

== Loss ==
Lady Mary Pelham was wrecked on 31 August 1849 at Port Fairy, Victoria, or Belfast as it was then officially named. She was anchored off the port awaiting a favourable wind when a fierce gale broke her chains. Captain Wing deliberately beached her, with the result that there were no deaths and most of her cargo was salvaged. Her back was broken and by mid-October wave action had completely broken her up.

== In art and public monuments ==
- A group of monuments overlooking Reeve's Point, Kangaroo Island, marks the spot where passengers disembarked from the first four ships (Duke of York, Lady Mary Pelham, Rapid and Cygnet).
