= Duke of York (1817 ship) =

British ship

Coordinates: 27°02′11.84″S 153°21′13.64″E

History

United Kingdom of Great Britain and Ireland
- Name: Duke of York
- Owner: 1817:Price; 1830:Bull & Co.; 1836:South Australia Company
- Operator: South Australia Company (1836)
- Builder: Bideford Shipyard
- Launched: 1817
- Fate: Wrecked 14 August 1837

General characteristics
- Class & type: Barque
- Tons burthen: 180, or 190, or 192 (bm)
- Length: 81 ft 3 in (24.8 m)
- Beam: 23 ft (7.0 m)
- Propulsion: Sails
- Sail plan: Three masted barque
- Crew: 1817:21; 1836:27
- Armament: 2 × 9-pounder guns

Duke of York was a three-masted brig (later barque) launched in 1817, at Bideford as a Falmouth packet, sailing between Falmouth, Cornwall, and Jamaica. In 1836, she brought settlers to South Australia for the South Australia Company. She was wrecked in 1837.

== Career ==
Duke of York first appeared in Lloyd's Register (LR) with "Price" (later J. Price), master and owner, and trade Falmouth–Jamaica. She was a Falmouth packet.

=== Packet voyages ===
The list of voyages below is not complete. In addition to the voyages to North and South America, Duke of York may have sailed to the Mediterranean and other destinations. For instance, on 17 November 1819, Duke of York was at Gibraltar on her way to Malta. Also, on the voyages to South America, Duke of York would have stopped at Madeira.

- Captain Price sailed from Falmouth on 13 March 1818. Duke of York sailed to New York via Halifax, Nova Scotia, both on her outward and inward journeys, and arrived back at Falmouth on 15 June.
- Captain Price sailed from Falmouth on 13 May 1819. Duke of York sailed to New York via Halifax both on her outward and inward journeys, and arrived back at Falmouth on 19 September.
- Captain Price sailed from Falmouth on 13 August 1820. Duke of York sailed to New York via Bermuda. From New York she sailed directly back to Falmouth, where she arrived on 9 March 1821.
- Duke of York sailed from Falmouth on 15 September 1821 and arrived at New York via Halifax. From New York she sailed directly back to Falmouth, where she arrived on 2 January 1821.
- Captain Donnellan left Falmouth on 16 June 1824, bound for New York. Duke of York stopped at Halifax on the outward and inward leg of her voyage and arrived back at Falmouth on 21 October.
- Captain Price left Falmouth on 25 April 1825, bound for Buenos Aires and Montevideo. Duke of York returned to Falmouth on 25 September.
- Captain Snell (acting) left Falmouth on 7 February 1826, bound for Buenos Aires and Montevideo. Duke of York returned to Falmouth on 1 July.
- Captain Snell left Falmouth on 17 November 1826, bound for New York. Duke of York stopped at Halifax on the outward and inward leg of her voyage and arrived back at Falmouth on 8 March 1827.
- Captain Snell left Falmouth on 23 April 1827, bound for Rio de Janeiro, Buenos Aires, and Montevideo. Duke of York returned to Falmouth on 30 September.
- Captain Sullivan (acting), left Falmouth on 8 April 1829, bound for Bermuda. Duke of York stopped at Halifax on the outward and inward leg of her voyage and arrived back at Falmouth on 15 July.
- Captain Snell left on 19 November 1830, bound for Rio de Janeiro, Buenos Aires, Montevideo ad Rio again. She arrived back at Falmouth on 9 June 1831.
- Captain Snell left Falmouth on 5 November 1831, bound for Bermuda. Duke of York stopped at Halifax on the outward and inward leg of her voyage and arrived back at Falmouth on 11 March 1832.
- Captain Snell left Falmouth on 24 August 1832, bound for Rio de Janeiro, Buenos Aires, Montevideo ad Rio again. She arrived back at Falmouth on 5 February 1833.
- Captain Snell left Falmouth on 5 July 1834 and arrived at Halifax on 2 August. Duke of York left Halifax on 14 August and arrived back at Falmouth on 1 September.
- Captain James left Falmouth on 7 February 1835 and arrived at Halifax on 3 April. Duke of York arrived back at Falmouth on 8 May.

Year	Master	Owner	Trade	Source
1830	Snell	Bull & Co.	Falmouth Packet	LR
1833	Snell	Captain & Co.	Falmouth Packet	Register of Shipping
1836	Morgan	Angus & Co.	London–Australia	LR

=== Immigrant voyage ===
Under the command of Captain Robert Clark Morgan, and chartered by the South Australia Company, Duke of York left London on 24 February 1836, as part of the "First Fleet of South Australia", and arrived at Kangaroo Island on 27 July 1836, after 154 days at sea. The ship dropped anchor at Nepean Bay. She carried 42 passengers: 38 adults and four children, one of whom was selected by Morgan as the first of the fleet to set foot on the new land.

The settlers established Kingscote, the first free settlement in Australia. Duke of York was the first pioneer ship to reach South Australia with European settlers, as the start of the British colonisation of South Australia.

=== Whaling ===
Leaving the passengers on Kangaroo Island, Duke of York sailed on 20 September 1836, to hunt whales, without ever continuing to Holdfast Bay. She called at Hobart Town from 27 September 1836 to 18 October, to refresh and to proceed to the South Sea whaling grounds. On 10 February 1837, Morgan heard of the wreck of the schooner Active in the Fiji Islands. At Lakeba they took on board her master, Captain Dixon, her mate, Willings, and the supercargo, Wilkey.

== Shipwreck ==
Duke of York was whaling up the coast of Queensland when on 14 July 1837, she was shipwrecked off Port Curtis, near current day Gladstone, Queensland. The whole ship's company was saved and got into three boats. They rowed and sailed 300 miles to Moreton Bay, 14 miles from Brisbane, where they arrived Saturday 26 August 1837, after a most uncomfortable time. On the way down Aboriginals killed an English crewman, George Glansford, of Barking Essex, and a Rotumah native boy, named Bob, when the boats put in for water. The steamer James Watt took Morgan, the mate Bob Russell, and nineteen survivors on to Sydney, leaving the remainder to follow in another vessel. (Note: James Watt, of 142 tons (bm), was launched in Liverpool in 1824. Lloyd's Register showed her with home port of London and trade London to New South Wales.)
