= David McLaren (colonial manager) =

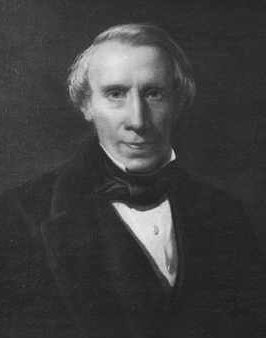
David McLaren ca. 1830

David McLaren (1785 – 22 June 1850) was a Scottish accountant and lay preacher who served as Resident Manager of the South Australian Company for the Colony of South Australia from 1837 to 1841.

== Biography ==
In 1835, through acquaintanceship with George Fife Angas, he was appointed emigration agent for South Australia and sold shares in the South Australian Company. Then he was offered the post of Manager of the Colony; he sailed in the Company's barque South Australian. During a 12 day stay at Cape Town, South Africa the governor gave him vine clippings to take to South Australia. He landed at Kingscote, Kangaroo Island on 22 April 1837. He did not have the practical skills and knowledge of his predecessor, Samuel Stephens, but he was an effective money-manager and by prudent investment (and some constructive bookkeeping) he improved the fortunes of the Company and its subsidiary South Australian Bank, while making few friends. He appears to fit the stereotype of the parsimonious Scot: the editor of the Register on the occasion of his farewell dinner wrote of a man wielding "immense influence for good or for evil ... object of divided feelings ... (not always acting on) right or sound and comprehensive views". And the triumphs of his administration, the New Port and the Company's banking operations, he ascribes to G. S. Kingston and Edward Stephens respectively. The Register (or the South Australian Gazette and Colonial Register as it was then titled) was scathing in its criticism of both McLaren and the Resident Commissioner J. H. Fisher.

In January 1841 he returned to London, where his family joined him, as the Company's manager and continued to run its business profitably, and to the benefit of the Colony. Evidence he gave to the select committee on Australian shipping led to the repeal of the Navigation Acts in 1849.

== Church and family ==
McLaren travelled alone to Australia, leaving his wife and family behind. His social life in the colony appears to have centred on his church — he acted as minister for a Baptist congregation which from July 1838 met at W. Finlayson's cottage in Rundle Street, later the site of Charles Birks' shop. and held their first public services in September that year. McLaren served as their regular, and very successful, lay pastor, official duties permitting. He carried out baptisms in the River Torrens in 1840.

His son, the noted Baptist preacher and author, Alexander Maclaren (1826 – 1910) visited Australia in 1889.

== Recognition ==
It is possible that McLaren Vale (or McLaren's Vale) was named for him: the time of its naming and the Manager's eminence support this argument, but the weight of opinion is for the surveyor (later deputy Surveyor-general) John McLaren (died 17 July 1885), who worked in the area.

A wharf at Port Adelaide was named for him.

John McDouall Stuart named McLaren Creek after John McLaren.
